This is a list of television shows and television programs that are produced in the Philippines.

Arts and culture
Art Angel (2004–2011; GMA)
Art Is Kool (2002–2004; GMA, 2004–2005; ABC)
Art Jam (2005–2006; ABS-CBN)
Don't Give Up (2020; INC TV)
DepEd TV (produced by Department of Education (Philippines) 2020–2022; IBC)
Hometown: Doon Po Sa Amin (2007–2008; UNTV)
MagTV Na! (ABS-CBN Regional)
Noypi, Ikaw Ba To? (2006–2008; ABS-CBN)
Padayon: The NCAA Hour (produced by the National Commission for Culture and the Arts 2022–present; PTV and IBC)
Sining Gising
Silip: Sining at Lipunan (2004; ABS-CBN)
Tropang Potchi (2009–2011; Q, 2011–2015; GMA)
Tipong Pinoy (2010–2015; IBC)

Child- and/or youth-oriented

5 and Up (1992–1994, 2002–2003; ABC, 1994–2002; GMA)
AgriKids (2022–present; Kapamilya Channel/A2Z)
Ang Mahiwagang Baul (2005–2007; GMA)
Ang TV (1992–1997; ABS-CBN)
Ang Say ng Kabataan (A.S.K.) (2006–2008; NBN)
Art Jam (2004–2006; ABS-CBN)
ATBP: Awit, Titik at Bilang na Pambata (1994–1998; ABS-CBN)
Bagets: Just Got Lucky (2011–2012; TV5)
Batang Kaharian (SMNI)
Batibot (1984–1991; RPN, 1984–1991, 1994–1995; PTV, 1991–1994; ABS-CBN; 1995–2001; GMA [as Batang Batibot], TV5; 2010–2013)
Bayani (1995–2001; ABS-CBN)
Berks (2002–2004; ABS-CBN)
Bread Tambayan (2007–2011; UNTV)
Buttercup (2003–2004; ABS-CBN)
Captain Flamingo (2006–2008; GMA Network)
Chikiting Patrol (1987–1988; IBC, 1988–1990; ABS-CBN, 1990–2002; GMA, 2003–2006; ABC)
Click (1999–2004; GMA)
Eskwela ng Bayan (2002–2003; NBN)
Epol/Apple (1999–2004; ABS-CBN)
Five and a Half (2007–2008; Studio 23)
F.L.A.M.E.S (1996–2002; ABS-CBN)
For Kids Only (1994–2000; ABS-CBN, 2000–2001; RPN)
G-mik (1999–2002; ABS-CBN)
Generation K (2019–2020; SMNI)
Gimik (1996–1999; ABS-CBN)
Goin' Bulilit (2005–2019; ABS-CBN)
Growing Up (2011–2012; ABS-CBN)
Happy Land (2009–2010; GMA)
Hero City Kids Force (2022; Kapamilya Channel/A2Z)
Hiraya Manawari (1995–2003; ABS-CBN) 
Joyride (2004–2005; GMA)
KNN: Kabataan News Network (2004–2008; NBN and ABC)
Kiddie Kwela (2008–2010; TV5)
Kids To Go (1998; RPN)
Kids HQ (2016–2018; Light TV)
Kids TV (2004–2006; RPN, 2006–2007; ABC)
Klasrum: Ibang Klase 'To (2014; UNTV)
The KNC Show (2004–present, UNTV)
The Pinoy TV Show
Koko Kwik Kwak (1999–2002; GMA)
Let's Go! (2006–2007; ABS-CBN)
Lola Basyang.com (2015; TV5)
Lovely Day (2004–2009; GMA)
Pinoy Shows
Luv U (2012–2016; ABS-CBN)
Math-Tinik (1997–2004; ABS-CBN)
MathDali (2016–present; Knowledge Channel, 2017–present; ABS-CBN)
Mga Kuwento ni Lola Basyang (2007; GMA)
Ora Engkantada (1986–1990; IBC)
Pahina (2000–2001, ABS-CBN)
Parent Experiment (2022–present; Kapamilya Channel, A2Z/Jeepney TV)
Penpen De Sarapen (1987–2001; RPN)
Pidol's Wonderland (2010–2013; TV5)
Salam (2006–2007; ABS-CBN)
Sine'skwela (1994–2004; ABS-CBN)
Sirit (2007; ABS-CBN)
SCQ Reload (2004–2005; ABS-CBN)
Star Magic Presents (2006–2008, ABS-CBN)
Tara Tena (2003–2004, ABS-CBN)
Team Yey! (2016–2020; Yey!, 2020–present; Kapamilya Channel/A2Z)
Teens (2006–2008; ABC)
The Young Once (2007–2009; NBN)
Tropang Potchi (2009–2011; Q, 2011–2015; GMA)
Tween Hearts (2010–2012; GMA)
Wansapanataym (1997–2005, ; ABS-CBN)
Y2K: Yes 2 Kids (1998–2003; IBC)

Comedy

1 for 3 (1997–2001; GMA)
13, 14, 15 (1989–1990; IBC)
Aalog-Alog (2006–2007; ABS-CBN)
Abangan ang Susunod na Kabanata (1991–1997; ABS-CBN)
Alabang Girls (1992–1994; ABC)
All Together Now (2003–2004; GMA)
Andres de Saya (2011; GMA)
Ang Manok ni San Pedro (1987–1991; RPN/IBC)
Ang Tanging Ina (2003–2005; ABS-CBN)
Ang TV (1992–1997; ABS-CBN)
Ang TV 2 (2001–2003; ABS-CBN)
Ano Ba'ng Hanap Mo? (2006–2007; IBC)
Apple Pie, Patis, Pate, Atbp. (1987–1989; RPN)
Attagirl (2001–2002; ABS-CBN)
Ay Robot! (2005–2007; QTV)
Back to Iskul Bukol (1999–2000; IBC)
Bahay Mo Ba 'To? (2004–2007; GMA)
Baltic & Co. (1974–1976; GMA)
BalitaOneNan (2022–present; TV5/BuKo)
Banana Sundae (2008–2020; ABS-CBN)
Barkada Trip (2004–2009, Studio 23)
Baywalk (2005; QTV)
Beh Bote Nga (1999–2003; GMA)
Betty and the Beast
Bida si Mister, Bida si Misis (2002–2005; ABS-CBN)
Bidang Kontrabida
Billy Bilyonaryo (1994–1995; GMA)
Bistek
Bitoy's Adventures in Bilibkaba? (1997–2001; GMA)
Bitoy's Funniest Videos (2004–2009; GMA)
  Bitoy's Funniest Home Videos,  Bitoy's Funniest Videos: Yari ka
Bitoy's World (2001–2002; GMA)
Boarding House (1969–1972; ABS-CBN)
Bola Bola (2022; Kapamilya Channel/A2Z)
Bora: Sons of the Beach (2005–2006; ABS-CBN)
Bubble Gang (1995–present; GMA)
Bubble Gang Jr. (2005; GMA)
Buddy en Sol (1990–1995; RPN)
Buhay Artista (1964–1972; ABS-CBN)
Cafeteria Aroma (1969–1972; ABS-CBN, 1979; RPN, 1983–1984; GMA)
C.U.T.E. (Call Us Two for Entertainment) (1980; IBC)
Chicks to Chicks (1979–1987; IBC)
Chika Chika Chicks (1987–1991; ABS-CBN)
Champoy (1980–1985; RPN)
Daboy en Da Girl (2002–2003; GMA)
Daddy's Gurl (2018–present; GMA)
Daddy Di Do Du (2001–2007; GMA)
Dalawang Tisoy (2007; RPN)
Dok Ricky, Pedia (2017–2020; ABS-CBN)
Dear Uge (2016–2022; GMA)
Eh Kasi Babae (1987–1988, IBC)
Eto Na Ang Susunod Na Kabanata (2001, ABS-CBN)
Everybody Hapi (2008–2010; TV5)
Exclusive Champoy (RPN)
Four Da Boys (1991–1993; IBC)
FPJ's Batang Quiapo (2023–present; Kapamilya Channel,Cine Mo!, A2Z/TV5)
Ful Haus (2007–2009; GMA)
Funny Ka, Pare Ko (2016–present; CineMo!)
Gabi ni Dolphy (1990; RPN)
Gag Ito (2006–2007; Studio 23)
Gag U! (2012–2014; Studio 23)
Goin' Bananas (1986–1987; IBC, 1987–1991; ABS-CBN)
Goin' Bulilit (2005–2019; ABS-CBN)
Gorio And His Jeepney (1966–1968; ABC)
Gudtaym (2006; ABS-CBN)
 (2005–2007; QTV)
Hapi ang Buhay (2016; Net 25)
Hapi Together (2010–2011; TV5)
Hapi House! (1987–1989; IBC)
Hay, Bahay! (2016–2017; GMA)
Haybol Rambol (1993–1995; GMA)
He's Into Her (2021–2022; Kapamilya Channel/A2Z)
Hokus Pokus (2005; GMA)
Home Along Da Airport (2003–2005; ABS-CBN)
Home Along Da Riles (1992–2003; ABS-CBN)
Home Sweetie Home (2014–2020; ABS-CBN)
I Laugh Sabado (2010–2011; Q)
Ibang Klase (1997–1998; GMA)
Idol Ko si Kap (2000–2005; GMA)
Iskul Bukol (1978–1988; IBC, 2011; TV5)
Ismol Family (2014–2016; GMA)
Ispup (1999–2004; ABC)
  Ispup Atbp.
John en Marsha (1973–1990; RPN)
John en Shirley (2006–2007; ABS-CBN)
Kami Naman (1990; RPN)
Kaya ni Mister, Kaya ni Misis (1997–2001; ABS-CBN)
Kemis: Kay Misis Umaasa (2007; RPN)
Kiss Muna (2000–2001; GMA)
Kool Ka Lang (1999–2003; GMA)
Kulit Bulilit (IBC)
Lagot Ka... Isusumbong Kita! (2003–2007; GMA)
Lakas Tawa (2017–present; CineMo!)
Laugh to Laugh: Ang Kulit! (2005–2006; QTV)
Let's Go! (2006–2007; ABS-CBN)
Lokomoko (2008–2013; TV5)
  Lokomoko High, Lokomoko U
Luv U (2012–2016; ABS-CBN)
Mag-Asawa'y Di Biro (1990–1993; RPN)
MTB (2011–2013; GMA News TV)
#MichaelAngelo: The Sitcom (2017; GMA News TV)
Mongolian Barbecue (1990–1991; IBC, 1992–1994; RPN)
My Juan and Only (2005–2006; ABS-CBN)
My Darling Aswang (2010–2011; TV5)
My Papa Pi (2022–Present; Kapamilya Channel/A2Z/Jeepney TV)
Naks! (2004–2005; GMA)
Nuts Entertainment (2003–2008; GMA)
Ober Da Bakod (1992–1997; GMA)
Ogag (1996–1998; ABC)
Ogags (2008–2010; TV5)
O-Ha! (2006–2007; ABC)
Ok Fine Whatever (2002–2004; ABS-CBN)
Ok Fine 'To Ang Gusto Nyo (2004–2006; ABS-CBN)
OK ka'tol (IBC)
Okay Ka, Fairy Ko! (1987–1989; IBC, 1989–1995; ABS-CBN, 1995–1997; GMA)
Oki Doki Doc (1993–2000; ABS-CBN)
  Ok Fine! Whatever, Ok Fine! Oh Yes
Palibhasa Lalake (1987–1998; ABS-CBN)
Pepito Manaloto (2010–2012; GMA)
Pepito Manaloto: Ang Tunay na Kwento (2012–2021; GMA)
Pepito Manaloto: Ang Unang Kwento (2021–2022; GMA)
Pepito Manaloto: Tuloy ang Kwento (2022–present; GMA)
Project 11 (2006; QTV)
Quizon Avenue (2005–2006; ABS-CBN)
Rated PangBayan: Pugad Baboy sa TV (1993–1994; GMA)
Rock and Roll 2000 (ABC)
Run To Me (2022; Kapamilya Channel/A2Z)
Show Me Da Manny (2009–2011; GMA)
Si Manoy at si Mokong (1997–1998; GMA)
Si Tsong, Si Tsang (1997–1998; GMA)
Spice Boys
Starzan
Sitak ni Jack (1987–1989; IBC)
Super Laff-In (1969–1972, 1996–1999; ABS-CBN)
Sunday 'Kada (2020–2021; TV5)
Tarajing Potpot (1999–2000; ABS-CBN)
Tipitipitim Tipitom (2005; RPN)
Toda Max (2011–2013; ABS-CBN)
T.O.D.A.S.: Television's Outrageously Delightful All-Star Show (1980–1989; IBC)
T.O.D.A.S. Again (1993; IBC)
Tropa Mo Ko Unli (2013–2015; TV5)
  Tropa Mo Ko: Nice, ‘Di Ba?, Tropa Mo Ko Unli Spoof
Tropang Trumpo (1994–1999; ABC)
TVJ on 5 (1992; ABC)
TVJ: Television's Jesters (1989–1992; IBC)
Vampire Ang Daddy Ko (2013–2016; GMA)
Wazzup Wazzup (2004–2007; Studio 23)
Whattamen (2001–2004; ABS-CBN)
Wow! (1998–2000; IBC)
Wow Mali! (1996–2008; ABC, 2009–2015; TV5)
Yes, Yes Show! (2004–2006; ABS-CBN)

Current and Public affairs

100% Pinoy! (2006–2008; GMA)
3-in-1 (2015, ABS-CBN)
Action 9 (1993–1998; RPN)
@ Ur Serbis (2008–2012; NBN/PTV)
Abante Pilipinas (2008–2010; NBN)
Adyenda (GMA, GMA News TV & Light Network)
Agenda (2015–2016; CNN Philippines)
Alas Singko Y Medya (1995–2002; ABS-CBN)
Aksyon Ngayon (2007–2016; DZMM TeleRadyo)
Aksyon Solusyon (2011–2020; AksyonTV/One PH)
Alagang Kapatid (2015–present; AksyonTV/One PH)
Ali (2005–2007; ABC)
Alisto! (2013–2020, 2021; GMA, 2020–2021; GMA News TV)
Amerika Atbp. (2000–2008; IBC)
Ano Ngani? (ABS-CBN Tacloban)
Arangkada (ABS-CBN Cagayan do Oro)
Astig! (2011–2012, 2013–2014; TV5)
At Your Service-Star Power (2004–2005; GMA, 2005–2007; QTV)
 formerly known as At Your Service
Bagong Pilipinas (2017–2020; PTV)
Balen (2017–present; CLTV36)
Balikatan: Sa Bahay at Buhay (1999–2011; NBN)
Balitang K (1996–2001; ABS-CBN)
Bahay at Bahay (1991–1998; IBC)
Bawal ang Pasaway kay Mareng Winnie (2011–2020; GMA News TV)
Bawat Pinoy Kapamilya
Bayan Ko, Sagot Ko (1994–1996; ABS-CBN)
Bet to Serve (2022; IBC)
Bigtime (2014–2015, TV5)
Bistado (2012–2015; ABS-CBN)
Bitag (2002; PTV, TV5 and IBC)
renamed Bitag Live
Biyaheng Langit (2000–2007; RPN, 2007–2013; IBC, 2013–2019; PTV, 2019-present, RJ DigiTV)
Biz Mode (2016; CLTV36)
BizNews (2009–2011; NBN, 2011–2015, 2017–present; PTV)
Breakfast (1999–2007, Studio 23)
Bridging Borders (2015–2017; PTV)
BolJak (2018–2020; AksyonTV/One PH)
Cerge For Truth (2003–2007; RPN)
Chink Positive (2011–present; AksyonTV/One PH)
Cocktales (2011–2014; AksyonTV)
Congress in Action with Freddie Abando (2009–2012; NBN/PTNI/PTV)
Damayan (1969–1972; ABS-CBN, 1975–1980; GTV4, 1980–1986; MBS, 1986–2001; PTV, 2001–2010; NBN)
Daybreak (2014–2015; 9TV)
formerly known as Solar Daybreak
Dayo (2013; TV5)
Demolition Job (2013–2015; TV5)
Diskurso (2016–2017; CLTV36)
Diskusyon (2014–2019; Net 25)
Diyos at Bayan (1998–present;  Light TV, 1998–2001, 2002–2005; RPN, 2001–2002; NBN, 2005–2011; QTV, 2006–2019; GMA, 2011–2019; GMA News TV, 2021–present; A2Z)
Dong Puno De Kalibre (2011–2013; AksyonTV)
Dra. Bles @ Ur Serbis (2001–2020; DZMM TeleRadyo)
Du30 on Duty (2019–2022; IBC)
Duelo kasama si Dick Gordon (2011–2013; AksyonTV)
Entrepinoy Start-Up (2002–2005; IBC)
Export... Made in the Philippines (1986–1993; IBC)
Failon Ngayon (2009–2020; ABS-CBN)
Focus (2010–2012, 2016–2017; CLTV36)
Gabay at Aksyon (2013–2016; PTV)
Good Take (2000–2005; IBC)
Good Morning Club (2012–2014; TV5)
Good Morning Kuya (2007–present; UNTV/UNTV Life/UNTV)
Hamon: Central Luzon (CLTV36)
Harapan (2008; ABS-CBN)
HB (Hamon ng Bayan) (CLTV36)
Healthline (2006–2008, ABC, 2009–2013; IBC)
History with Lourd (2013–2016; TV5)
Hoy! Gising! (1992–2001, ABS-CBN)
Hotline sa Trese (1990–1992; IBC)
 Idol in Action (2020–2021, TV5/One PH)
Ikaw at ang Batas (2000–2007, RPN)
The Inside Story (1990–1998; ABS-CBN)
I M Ready sa Dobol B (2019–2021; GMA News TV)
Insider Exclusive Kapihan (2017–present; PTV)
IRL (2020–2021; GMA News TV)
Iskoolmates (2015–present; PTV)
Isumbong Mo Kay Tulfo / Isumbong Mo (Tulfo Brothers) (1997–2006, RPN)
 Isyu Ngayon (2010–2015; GMA Regional TV)
Isyu Ngayon North Central Luzon
Isyu Ngonian Bicolandia
Isyu Subong Ilonggo
Isyu Subong Negrense
Isyu Karon Central Visayas
Isyu Karon Northern Mindanao
Isyu Karon Southern Mindanao
Isyu Karon Soccsksargen
Isyu One-on-One with Ceasar Soriano (2019–2022; PTV)
Iyo Ang Katarungan (2003–2010; IBC)
Kalusugan TV
Kapayapaan Atin Ito (2001–2009; NBN)
Kasangga Mo Ang Langit (1998–2007; RPN, 2007–2013; IBC, 2013–2019; PTV, 2019-present, RJ DigiTV)
Kay Susan Tayo! (2003–2009; GMA)
KWATRObersyal (2015–2017; PTV)
Kay Susan Tayo sa Super Radyo DZBB (2019–2020; GMA News TV)
KBYN: Kaagapay ng Bayan (2022–present; Kapamilya Channel, A2Z/TeleRadyo)
Kilos Pronto (2016; UNTV, 2017–2018; PTV)
Knowledge Power (ABS-CBN)
Konsyumer ATBP. (2007–2020; DZMM Teleradyo, 2020–present; GMA News TV)
Laging Handa Dokyu (2020–2022; PTV and IBC)
Law Profile (2010–2016; UNTV)
Legal Forum (1992–2006; RPN)
Legal Help Desk (2012–2016, Solar News Channel/9TV/CNN Philippines)
Linawin Natin (2001–2007; IBC)
Legal Matters (2017–present; CLTV36)
Lukso Ng Dugo (ABS-CBN)
Magandang Gabi, Bayan (1988–2005; ABS-CBN)
Magandang Gabi Pilipinas with Ceasar Soriano (2019–2022; PTV)
Magandang Umaga, Bayan (2002–2005; ABS-CBN)
Magandang Umaga, Pilipinas (2005–2007; ABS-CBN)
Magpayo Nga Kayo (2007–2020; DZMM TeleRadyo)
Manindigan (2017, TV5)
Matanglawin (2008–2020; ABS-CBN)
MIB: Mga Imbestigador ng Bayan (1999; ABS-CBN)
Mike Abe Live (2022–present; PTV and IBC)
MedTalk (2013–2017, Solar News Channel/9TV/CNN Philippines)
MedTalk Health Talk (2018–present, CNN Philippines)
Metro One (2012–2013; PTV)
Metro Sabado (2011–2020; AksyonTV/One PH)
MMDA: On The Road (2002–2009; NBN)
New Day @ NBN (2001–2002; NBN)
Mission Possible (2015–present; ABS-CBN)
Mukha (2014–present, ABS-CBN (on occasional basis), ABS-CBN News Channel & DZMM TeleRadyo)
Mutya ng Masa (2013–2015, ABS-CBN)
My Puhunan (2013–2015, 2015-2020, ABS-CBN)
Munting Pangarap (2008–2018; UNTV)
News.PH (2013–2017; Solar News Channel/9TV/CNN Philippines)
Negosyoso (2017–present; CLTV36)
Network Briefing News (2020–2022; PTV and IBC)
Numero (2013–2014; TV5)
OK si Dok (2007–present; CLTV36)
OMJ : Oh My Job! (2020–2022; GMA News TV/GTV)
On Record (2021–2022; GMA)
Oplan Asenso (2011–2020; AksyonTV/One PH)
One-Stop Shop (2017–present; CLTV36)
Orly Mercado: All Ready!(2013–2019; AksyonTV/One PH)
Palaban (2006–2007; GMA)
Pareng Partners (2018–2019; ABS-CBN)
Payo Alternatibo (2016–2019; PTV)
People, Politics and Power (2010–2012; NBN/PTNI/PTV)
People's Government Mobile Action (2008–2010; NBN)
Philippines Most Wanted (1998–2002; PTV/NBN)
Pilipinas, Gising Ka Na Ba? (2005–2007; UNTV)
Pinoy MD sa Super Radyo DZBB (2019–present; GMA News TV/GTV, 2023–present Pinoy Hits)
Pinoy Records (2007–2010: GMA)
Pinoy True Stories: Demandahan (2012–2013; ABS-CBN)
Pinoy True Stories: Engkwentro (2012–2013; ABS-CBN)
Pinoy True Stories: Saklolo (2012–2013; ABS-CBN)
Pinoy US Cops: Ride Along (2012–2018; PTV)
Problema N'yo, Sagot Ko! (2003–2005; NBN)
Profiles (2015–present; CNN Philippines)
PTV Special Forum (2012–2016; PTV)
Public Demand (2016; CLTV36)
Public Forum (1987–1990; IBC)
QUAT: Quick Action Team (2011–2015; UNTV)
Raket Science (2020–2022; One PH)
Reaksyon (2012–2013, 2014–2017; TV5 & AksyonTV)
Real Stories kasama si Loren (2004–2007; ABC)
Relasyon (2011–2020; AksyonTV/One PH)
RealiTV: Mga Bidyong Nakakabilib (2015, ABS-CBN)
Red Alert (2014–2015, 2015–present; ABS-CBN)
Rescue 5 (2013–2014; TV5)
Rise and Shine Pilipinas (2020-2021, PTV)
RPN Forum (2003–2005; RPN)
Rotary in Action (2010–2020; UNTV)
RxMen (2005–2008, QTV)
Salamat Dok (2004–2020; ABS-CBN)
Salamin ng Buhay (2017–present; CLTV36)
Salandigan (ABS-CBN Bacolod)
Sapul sa Singko (2010–2012; TV5)
Serbis on the Go (2004–2008; IBC)
Serbisyo All Access (2014–2017, Solar News Channel/9TV/CNN Philippines)
Serbisyong Kasangbahay (2006–present; UNTV)
Serbisyo Muna (2005–2008; NBN)
Serbisyo Publiko (2004–2014; UNTV)
S.O.C.O. (Scene of the Crime Operatives) (2005–2020; ABS-CBN)
Social TV: Anything and Everything about Metro Central Luzon (2016–2017; CLTV36)
Agri Ka Ba?
Asenso Sigurado
Centro: TV Program of City of San Fernando, Pampanga
Ibang Klase Talaga
Kabaro
Usapang Biz-ness
SSS: Kabalikat Natin (2010–2011; IBC)
So to Speak (2008–present; CLTV36)
S.R.O. (radio program) (2010–present; TeleRadyo)
Swak na Swak (2006–2020; ABS-CBN)
Talking Points: Ang Tinig ng Serbisyo Publiko (2011–2012; NBN/PTNI/PTV)
Tapatan Kay Luis Beltran (1987–1988; IBC)
Tapatan with Jay Sonza (1995–2005; GMA/UNTV/RPN)
Talakayan sa Isyung Pulis (2007–2011; NBN)
Tech Ka Muna (2020–2022; One PH)
Tech Sabado (2015–2020; AksyonTV/One PH)
T3: Alliance (2011–2016; TV5)
Talakayan Ngayon (CLTV36)
Tapatan ni Tunying (2013–2020, ABS-CBN)
Tayuan Mo At Panindigan (2011–2012; AksyonTV)
Tinig ng Bayan (2005–2007; NBN)
Trabaho Panalo! (2008–2014; DZMM TeleRadyo)
The Dean Mel Show (2020–2022; One PH)
The Inside Story (1990–1998; ABS-CBN)
The Police Hour (1992–2007; RPN)
The Veronica Chronicles (2012–2017; PTV)
Thinking Pinoy on SMNI (SMNI)
Tulay: Your Bridge to Understanding, Peace and Prosperity (2016–2022; PTV)
Tulong Ko, Pasa Mo (2017–2018; TV5)
Tutok Erwin Tulfo (2020–2022; PTV)
Turning Point (2017; TV5)
Umagang Kay Ganda (2007–2020; ABS-CBN)
Unang Hirit (1999–present; GMA)
Unlad Pilipinas with Ceasar Soriano (2019–2022; PTV)
Up Close and Personal with Marissa del Mar (2002–2011; IBC)
Usapang Real Life (2020–2021; TV5)
Usaping Bayan (SMNI)
Uswag Pinas (2020–2022; PTV and IBC)
Wagi (CLTV36)
Wanted sa Radyo (AksyonTV, 2011–2019; 2019–present; One PH)
Wanted Ang Serye (2021; TV5)
Wasak (2011–2016; AksyonTV)
Youth for Truth (2020–2022; PTV and IBC)

Documentaries

Anatomy of a Disaster (2010–2011; GMA)
Balitang K (1996–2001; ABS-CBN)
Born to Be Wild (2007–present, GMA)
Calvento Files (1995–1998; ABS-CBN)
Case Unclosed (2008–2010; GMA)
Crime Klasik (2011–2013; AksyonTV)
The Correspondents (1998–2010; ABS-CBN)
Dokumentado (2010–2011; TV5/2011–2015; AksyonTV)
Dokyu (2005–2007; ABC)
Emergency (1995–2009; GMA)
Footprints (2010–2012, Net 25)
Front Row (2011–2021, GMA)
Gus Abelgas: Nag-Uulat
I Survived: Hindi Sumusuko Ang Pinoy (2009–2010; ABS-CBN)
Imbestigador (2000–present; GMA)
Investigative Documentaries (2011–2020; GMA News TV)
i-Witness (1999–present; GMA/GMA News TV/GTV)
Jessica Soho Reports (2001–2005, GMA)
Kaagapay (2006–2016, UNTV)
Kapag May Katwiran, Ipaglaban Mo / Ipaglaban Mo (1988–1992 IBC 13; 1993–1999, 2014–2020; ABS-CBN, 2020–present; Kapamilya Channel, 2021–present; A2Z)
Kapuso Mo, Jessica Soho (2004–present; GMA)
Kaya (2014–2016; TV5)
Kay Susan Tayo! (2003–2009; GMA)
KBYN: Kaagapay ng Bayan (2022–present; Kapamilya Channel, A2Z/TeleRadyo)
Krusada (2010–2013; ABS-CBN)
Kuha All! (2022–present; All TV)
Kuha Mo! (2019–2020; ABS-CBN)
Lakbai (2017; TV5)
Mobile Kusina (2005–2006, GMA)
Motorcycle Diaries (2011–2017; GMA News TV)
Mukha (2014–present, ABS-CBN (on occasional basis), ABS-CBN News Channel & DZMM TeleRadyo)
Nagmamahal, Kapamilya (2006, ABS-CBN)
Negosyuniversity (2020–present; INC TV)
New Normal: The Survival Guide (2020; GMA News TV)
OFW Diaries (2009–2011; GMA)
One News Documentaries (2019–present, One News/One PH)
Out of Control (2013–2014; GMA)
Patrol ng Pilipino (2010–2013; ABS-CBN)
Pinoy Abroad (2005–2006; GMA)
Pinoy Meets World (2006–2009; GMA)
Pipol (1999–2006, ABS-CBN)
Private I (2003–2005, ABS-CBN)
Probe (1987, 2005–2010; ABS-CBN, 1988–2003; GMA, 2004–2005; ABC)
Rated K (2004–2020; ABS-CBN, 2020–present; TV5/One PH, 2021–present; Kapamilya Channel/A2Z)
Rated Korina (2020–present)
 Reel Time (2011–2020, GMA News TV, 2020–2022, GMA)
Reporter's Notebook (2004–2020; GMA, 2020–present; GMA News TV)
Rescue (2010–2013; GMA)
Simpleng Hiling
Sine Totoo (2007–2009; GMA)
S.O.C.O. (Scene of the Crime Operatives) (2005–2020; ABS-CBN)
S.O.S.: Stories of Survival (2005–2008; ABC)
Stories of Hope (2021-present, GMA)
SMNI Special Reports (SMNI)
Takip Silip (2008–2011; NBN/PTNI)
Taas Noo, Bulakenyo! (2007–2008; NBN)
Taas Noo, Pilipino! (2007–2008; NBN)
Tutok Tulfo (2010–2012; TV5)
Ugnayang Pambansa (2001–2003; NBN)
USI: Under Special Investigation (2010–2012; TV5)
Victim (2003–2005, ABS-CBN)
Victim: Undercover
What I See (CNN Philippines)
Wish Ko Lang (2002–present; GMA)
XXX: Exklusibong, Explosibong, Exposé (2006–2013, ABS-CBN)

Drama anthologies and series

1DOL (2010; ABS-CBN)
2 Good 2 Be True (2022; Kapamilya Channel, A2Z, TV5/Jeepney TV)
5 Star Specials (2010; TV5)
A Family Affair (2022; Kapamilya Channel, A2Z, TV5/Jeepney TV)
A Love to Last (2017; ABS-CBN)
Agawin Mo Man Ang Lahat (2006; GMA)
Agila (1987–1992; RPN and ABS-CBN)
Akin Pa Rin ang Bukas (2013; GMA)
Ako si Kim Samsoon (2008; GMA)
Alakdana (2011; GMA)
All About Eve (2009; GMA)
All My Life (2009; GMA)
Ang Dalawang Mrs. Real (2014; GMA)
Ang sa Iyo ay Akin (2020–2021; Kapamilya Channel, A2Z/TV5/Jeepney TV)
Anna Karenina * (1996–2002, ; GMA)
Annaliza (2013–2014; ABS-CBN)
Apoy sa Dagat (2013; ABS-CBN)
Apoy sa Langit (2022; GMA)
Asawa Ko, Karibal Ko (2018–2019; GMA)
Ate ng Ate Ko (2020, TV5)
Babangon Ako't Dudurugin Kita (2008; GMA)
Babawiin Ko ang Lahat (2021; GMA)
Bagito (2014–2015; ABS-CBN)
Bagong Umaga (2020–2021; Kapamilya Channel/A2Z)
Basta't Kasama Kita (2003–2004; ABS-CBN)
Be Careful with My Heart (2012–2014; ABS-CBN)
Be My Lady (2016; ABS-CBN)
BFGF (2010–2011; TV5)
Bihag (2019; GMA)
Bituin (2002–2003; ABS-CBN)
Bolera (2022; GMA/GTV)
Boracay
Born for You (2016; ABS-CBN)
Bridges of Love (2015; ABS-CBN)
Bukas May Kahapon (2019; IBC 13)
Calla Lily (2006; ABS-CBN)
Calvento Files (1995–1998; ABS-CBN)
Cain at Abel (2018–2019; GMA)
Carmela (2014; GMA)
Cebu (RPN)
Daisy Siete (2003–2010; GMA)
Davao (RPN)
Dear Friend (2008–2010; GMA)
 Descendants of the Sun (2020; GMA)
Destined to be Yours (2017; GMA)
Dolce Amore (2016; ABS-CBN)
Dirty Linen (2023–present; Kapamilya Channel, Jeepney TV, A2Z/TV5)
Diva (2010; GMA)
Dream Dad (2014–2015; ABS-CBN)
 Esperanza (1997–1999; ABS-CBN)
The Fake Life (2022; GMA)
Flames (1996–2002; ABS-CBN)
First Lady (2022, GMA/GTV)
First Yaya (2021, GMA) 
Flower of Evil (2022; Kapamilya Channel, A2Z, Jeepney TV/TV5)
Forevermore (2014–2015; ABS-CBN)
FPJ's Ang Probinsyano (2015–2020; ABS-CBN, 2020–2022 Kapamilya Channel, Cine Mo!/A2Z, 2021–2022; TV5)
FPJ's Batang Quiapo (2023–present; Kapamilya Channel, Cine Mo!, A2Z/TV5)
Gaano Kadalas Ang Minsan? (2008; GMA)
Genesis (2013; GMA)
Ginintuang Telon (2005–2006, QTV)
Give Love on Christmas (2014–2015; ABS-CBN)
Got to Believe (2013–2014; ABS-CBN)
Gulong ng Palad (1977–1979; 1983–1985: BBC/City2; 2006: ABS-CBN)
The Half Sisters (2014–2016; GMA)
Halik (2018–2019; ABS-CBN)
Hawak Kamay (2014; ABS-CBN)
Heartful Cafe (2021, GMA)
Heredero
Hiram na Alaala (2014; GMA)
Hooo U (2006, GMA) 
Ikaw Lamang (2014; ABS-CBN)
Ikaw Lang ang Iibigin (2017–2018; ABS-CBN)
Ikaw Lang ang Mamahalin * (2001–2002, ; GMA)
Ikaw sa Puso Ko (2004; GMA)
Ikaw Sana (2009–2010; GMA)
I Left My Heart in Sorsogon (2021–2022; GMA)
Ilumina (2010; GMA)
Impostora (2007; GMA)
Inagaw na Bituin (2019; GMA)
Inday Bote (2015; ABS-CBN)
Innamorata (2014; GMA)
Judy Ann Drama Special (1999–2001; ABS-CBN)
Juan dela Cruz (2013; ABS-CBN)
K (IBC)
Kahit Nasaan Ka Man (2013; GMA)
Kailan Ba Tama ang Mali? (2015; GMA)
Kailangan  Ko'y Ikaw (2013; ABS-CBN)
Kakabakaba (2000–2002, GMA)
Kakabakaba Adventures (2004–2005; GMA)
Kakabaka-Boo? (2005–2006, GMA)
Kambal Sirena (2014; GMA)
Kara Mia (2019; GMA)
Kung Mamahalin Mo Lang Ako (2005–2006; GMA)
Kung Tayo'y Magkakalayo (2010; ABS-CBN)
Krusada Kontra Krimen (2005–2007; NBN and IBC)
Krusada Kontra Korupsyon (2007–2008; NBN and IBC)
Langit Lupa (2016–2017; ABS-CBN)
La Vida Lena (2021–2022; Kapamilya Channel, A2Z, TV5/Jeepney TV)
The Legal Wife (2014; ABS-CBN)
Little Champ (2013; ABS-CBN)
Los Bastardos (2018–2019; ABS-CBN)
Love in 40 Days (2022; Kapamilya Channel, A2Z, TV5/Jeepney TV)
Love Bug (2010; GMA)
Love Spell (2006–2008; ABS-CBN)
Love of My Life (2020–2021; GMA)
Love Thy Woman (2020; ABS-CBN/Kapamilya Channel, 2021–2022; A2Z)
Love to Love (2003–2006; GMA)
Love You Stranger (2022; GMA)
Luna Mystika (2008–2009; GMA)
Lyra (1996–1997; GMA)
Maalaala Mo Kaya (1991–2020; ABS-CBN, 2020–2022; Kapamilya Channel/A2Z)
Magpahanggang Wakas (2016–2017; ABS-CBN)
Magpakailanman (2002–2007/2012–present; GMA)
Magkaagaw (2019–2021; GMA)
Makita Ka Lang Muli (2006–2007; GMA)
Mangarap Ka (2004; ABS-CBN)
Mara Clara * (1992–1997, ; ABS-CBN)
Maria Flordeluna (2007; ABS-CBN)
Maria Morena (1980, BBC 2)
 Marinella (1999–2001; ABS-CBN)
Maynila (1998–2020; GMA)
Mga Anghel na Walang Langit (2005–2006; ABS-CBN)
Mga Mata ni Angelita (2007; GMA)
Mirabella (2014; ABS-CBN)
Moon of Desire (2014; ABS-CBN)
More Than Words (2014–2015; GMA)
Mula sa Puso * (1997–1999, ; ABS-CBN)
Muli (2007; GMA)
Mundo Mo'y Akin (2013; GMA)
Munting Heredera (2011–2012; GMA)
My Binondo Girl (2011–2012; ABS-CBN)
My Dear Heart (2017; ABS-CBN)
My Fantastic Pag-Ibig (2021; GMA News TV/GTV)
My Guardian Abby (2005–2006; QTV)
My Husband's Lover (2013; GMA)
My Special Tatay (2018–2019; GMA)
My Super D (2016; ABS-CBN)
Nang Ngumiti ang Langit (2019; ABS-CBN)
Nathaniel (2015; ABS-CBN)
Ngayon at Kailanman (2018–2019; ABS-CBN)
Nginiig (2004–2006; ABS-CBN)
Niña Niño (2021–2022; TV5)
Ningning (2015–2016; ABS-CBN)
Nita Negrita (2011; GMA)
Now and Forever (2005–2006; GMA)
Oh My G! (2015; ABS-CBN)
On the Wings of Love (2015–2016; ABS-CBN)
Once Upon a Kiss (2015; GMA)
Owe My Love (2021, GMA)
Paano ang Pangako? (2021; TV5)
Paano ang Pasko? (2020–2021; TV5)
Pahiram ng Sandali (2012–2013; GMA)
Pangako Sa 'Yo (2000–2002, ; ABS-CBN)
Pangako sa 'Yo (2015–2016; ABS-CBN)
Pangarap na Bituin (2007; ABS-CBN)
Pari 'Koy (2015; GMA)
Pasión de Amor (2015–2016; ABS-CBN)
Pinakamamahal (2006; GMA)
Playhouse (2018–2019; ABS-CBN)
Pure Love (2014; ABS-CBN)
Pyra: Babaeng Apoy (2013; GMA)
Recuerdo de Amor (2001–2003; ABS-CBN)
Prima Donnas (2019–2021; GMA)
Raising Mamay (2022; GMA)
Rhodora X (2014; GMA)
Rod Santiago's The Sisters (2011; TV5)
Saang Sulok ng Langit (2005; GMA)
Sahaya (2019; GMA)
Sana ay Ikaw na Nga * (2001–2003, ; GMA)
Sana Bukas pa ang Kahapon (2014; ABS-CBN)
Sana Dalawa ang Puso (2018; ABS-CBN)
Sana'y Wala Nang Wakas (2003–2004; ABS-CBN)
Sandara's Romance (2004; ABS-CBN)
Sarah the Teen Princess (2004; ABS-CBN)
Seasons of Love (2014, GMA)
Second Chances (2015; GMA)
Since I Found You (2018; ABS-CBN)
Sine Novela: Presents (2007–2010; GMA)
Sino ang Maysala?: Mea Culpa (2019; ABS-CBN)
Star Drama Presents (1993–2001; ABS-CBN)
Star Magic Presents (2006–2008; ABS-CBN)
Starla (2019–2020; ABS-CBN)
Start-Up (2022; GMA)
Temptation of Wife (2012–2013; GMA)
The Blood Sisters (2018; ABS-CBN)
The Borrowed Wife (2014; GMA)
The General's Daughter (2019; ABS-CBN)
The Gift (2019–2020; GMA)
The Good Son (2017–2018; ABS-CBN)
The Killer Bride (2019–2020; ABS-CBN)
The Lost Recipe (2021; GMA News TV/GTV)
The Maricel Drama Special (1989–1997; ABS-CBN)
The Story of Us (2016; ABS-CBN)
'Til Death Do Us Part (2005; ABS-CBN)
Till I Met You (2016–2017; ABS-CBN)
Two Wives (2014–2015; ABS-CBN)
 The Broken Marriage Vow (2022; Kapamilya Channel, A2Z, TV5/Jeepney TV)
The World Between Us (2021–2022; GMA) 
Ula Ang Batang Gubat (1990–1991; IBC 13)
Una Kang Naging Akin (2008; GMA)
Valiente * (1992–1995; ABS-CBN, 1995–1997; GMA, ; TV5)
Villa Quintana * (1995–1997, ; GMA)
Wag Kukurap (2004–2006; GMA)
Walang Hanggang Paalam (2020–2021; Kapamilya Channel, A2Z/TV5/Jeepney TV)
Widow's Web (2022; GMA/GTV)
Wildflower (2017–2018; ABS-CBN)
Yagit (2014–2015; GMA)
Your Song (2006–2011; ABS-CBN)

Fantasy series

A 100 Year Legacy (2013; GMA)
Agimat: Ang Mga Alamat ni Ramon Revilla (2009–2011; ABS-CBN)
Agua Bendita (2010; ABS-CBN)
Alakdana (2011; GMA)
Amaya (2011–2012; GMA)
Aryana (2012–2013; ABS-CBN)
Asian Treasures (2007; GMA)
Aso ni San Roque (2012–2013; GMA)
Atlantika (2006–2007; GMA)
Asian Treasures (2007; GMA)
Bagani (2018; ABS-CBN)
Batang X: The Next Generation (2008; TV5)
Biritera (2012; GMA)
Captain Barbell * (2006–2007, ; GMA)
Computerman (1990–1991; IBC)
Darating ang Umaga (2003; ABS-CBN)
Darna * (2005, 2009–2010; GMA)
Dwarfina (2011; GMA)
Encantadia (2005; GMA)
Encantadia: Pag-ibig Hanggang Wakas (2006; GMA)
Encantadia (2016–2017; GMA)
Etheria: Ang Ikalimang Kaharian ng Encantadia (2005–2006; GMA)
Fantastic Man (2007; GMA)
Fantastikids (2006; GMA)
Ikaw na Sana (1997–1998; GMA)
Imortal (2010–2011; ABS-CBN)
Kakambal ni Eliana (2013; GMA)
Kampanerang Kuba (2005; ABS-CBN)
Komiks (2006–2009; ABS-CBN)
Da Adventures of Pedro Penduko 
Komiks Presents: Dragonna 
Komiks Presents: Flash Bomba 
Komiks Presents: Kapitan Boom 
Komiks Presents: Tiny Tony 
Komiks Presents: Varga 
Nasaan Ka Maruja? 
Pedro Penduko at ang mga Engkantao 
Kapitan Awesome (2012–2013; TV5)
Krystala (2004–2005; ABS-CBN)
Kung Fu Kids (2008; ABS-CBN)
La Vendetta (2007–2008; GMA)
The Last Prince (2010; GMA)
Lastikman (2007–2008; ABS-CBN)
La Luna Sangre (2017–2018; ABS-CBN)
Lobo (2008; ABS-CBN)
Lolong (2022; GMA/GTV)
Lupin (2007–2008; GMA)
Machete (2011; GMA)
Magic Kamison (2007; GMA)
Magkano Ba ang Pag-ibig? (2013–2014; GMA)
Majika (2006; GMA)
Maria Clara at Ibarra (2022–2023; GMA/GTV, 2023; Pinoy Hits)
Marina (2004; ABS-CBN)
Marinara (2004; GMA)
Mars Ravelo's Darna: The TV Series (2022–2023; Kapamilya Channel, A2Z, TV5/Cine Mo!)
Mga Lihim ni Urduja (2023–present; GMA/GTV/Pinoy Hits)
Mulawin (2004–2005; GMA)
Mulawin vs. Ravena (2017; GMA)
Ora Engkantada (late 1980s; IBC & RPN)
Palos (2008; ABS-CBN)
Panday (2005–2006; ABS-CBN)
Panday Kids (2010; GMA)
Pinoy Thriller
Pidol's Wonderland (2010–2013; TV5)
Pintados (1999–2000; GMA)
Pyra: Ang Babaeng Apoy (2013; GMA)
Rounin (2007; ABS-CBN)
Spirits (2004–2005; ABS-CBN)
Sugo (2005–2006; GMA)
Super Inggo (2006–2007; ABS-CBN)
Super Twins (2007; GMA)
Wako Wako (2012; ABS-CBN)
Zaido: Pulis Pangkalawakan (2007–2008; GMA)
Zorro (2009; GMA)

Game shows

1 vs. 100  (Philippine version) (2007–2008; ABS-CBN)
1000 Heartbeats: Pintig Pinoy (2021; TV5)
Alaska Mini-Programa
All Star K! (2002–2009; GMA)
 formerly known as K!: The P1 Million Videoke Challenge
All Star Videoke (2017–2018; GMA)
B na B: Baliw na Baliw (1995–1997; ABC)
BandaOke! Rock 'N Roll to Millions (2009–2010; GMA)
Bawal Na Game Show (2020–2021, TV5)
Battle of the Brains (1992–1999; RPN, 2000–2001; PTV)
Blind Item (2005–2006, ABC)
Bet on Your Baby (2013–2014, 2014–2015, 2017; ABS-CBN)
 BIHASA: Biblia Hamon Sa 'Yo (2007–2008; UNTV)
Campus Challenge (2011–2013; UNTV)
Catch Me Out Philippines (2021; GMA)
Celebrity Bluff (2012–2016; 2017–2018; GMA)
Celebrity Playtime (2015–2016; ABS-CBN)
Da Big Show (2008; GMA)
Digital LG Challenge (2003–2004; GMA)
Digital LG Quiz (1999–2003; GMA)
Diz Iz It (2010, GMA)
Family Feud (2001–2002; ABC, 2008–2010, 2011, 2022–present; GMA, 2016–2017; ABS-CBN)
Family Kuarta o Kahon (1962–1972; ABS-CBN, 1973–1984; BBC, 1984–2000; RPN)
Fill in the Bank (2020-2021; TV5) 
Game Na Game Na! (1994–1996; ABS-CBN)
Game of The Gens (2021; GTV)
Game ng Bayan (2016; ABS-CBN)
Games Uplate Live (2006–2009; ABS-CBN)
GoBingo (GMA)
I Can See Your Voice (2017–2020; ABS-CBN, 2020–present; Kapamilya Channel/A2Z)
Kakasa Ka Ba Sa Grade 5? (2007–2009; GMA)
Kapamilya, Deal or No Deal (ABS-CBN)
Kapamilya Mas Winner Ka! (2007–2018; ABS-CBN Bacolod, ABS-CBN Cebu, ABS-CBN Davao)
Kol TV (2007–2008; RPN)
Korek Na Korek Ka Diyan! (2001; GMA)
Natiyempuhan Mo! (2007)
Now Na! (2006–2007; Q)
PCSO Lottery Draw (1995–2003; PTV/NBN, 2005–2011; NBN, 2011–present; PTNI/PTV, 2018–2020; ABS-CBN)
Pilipinas, Game KNB? (2001–2009; ABS-CBN)
  Game KNB?, Million Million Na, Game KNB?, Next Level Na, Game KNB?
Minute To Win It (2013–2014, 2016–2017, 2019; ABS-CBN)
Panahon Ko 'To: Ang Game Show ng Buhay Ko (2010; ABS-CBN)
Philippine Lottery Draw (2003–2005, ABC)
PIEnalo: Pinoy Games (2022–present; PIE Channel)
Pinoy Bingo Night (2009; ABS-CBN)
The Price is Right (2001–2003; ABC, 2011; ABS-CBN)
Ready, Get Set, Go! (1992–1997; ABS-CBN)
Sing Galing! (1998–2005; ABC)
Sing Galing! (2021–present; TV5)
Sorpresaya (2018–2019; CineMo!)
Super Games (1991; IBC, 1996–1997; GMA)
The Singing Bee (2008–2010, 2013–2015; ABS-CBN)
The Wall Philippines (2021; TV5, 2022–present; GMA)
Tok! Tok! Tok! Isang Milyon Pasok (2007–2008; GMA)
The Price Is Right (2001–2003; ABC, 2011; ABS-CBN)
The Weakest Link (2001–2002; IBC)
Twist and Shout (2010; ABS-CBN)
Whammy! Push Your Luck (2007–2008; GMA)
Wheel of Fortune  (2001–2002; ABC, 2008; ABS-CBN)
Who Wants to Be a Millionaire? (2000–2002; IBC, 2009–2015; TV5)

Home shopping
EZ Buy (2015–2016; IBC)
EZ Shop
Home Shopping Network (2003–2015)
Metro TV Shopping (2000–2005; ABC)
New Life TV Shopping
O Shopping  (2013–2020,  ABS-CBN; 2018–2020; S+A, 2020; Kapamilya Channel)
Proactiv Solution (2005–2008; ABC)
Quantum Showcase (2001–2005; ABC)
Shop Japan  (2014–2018; AksyonTV, TV5 and PTV)
Shop TV (2017–2018; AksyonTV)
Smart TV Shopping (1998–2002; IBC)
TV Shop Philippines (2015–2020, PTV and IBC)
Value Vision (1994–1998; ABC, 1998–2007; RPN, 1996–2005; IBC)
Venta5 Interactive TV Shopping (2006–2008; ABC)
Winner TV Shopping (2002–2008; ABC, 2005–2007; RPN, 2005–2014; PTV)

Horror
Gabi Ng Lagim
Guni-Guni (1996, ABC)
Hiwaga sa Bahay na Bato (1963–1964; ABS-CBN)
Hooo U? (2006, GMA)
Kakabakaba (2000–2002, GMA)
Kagat ng Dilim (2000-2001, IBC; 2020-2021, TV5)
Lihim ng Gabi (GMA)
Maligno (2008; ABS-CBN)
Midnight DJ (2008–2011; TV5)
Moomoo & Me (2009–2010, TV5)
Mysteries 2000 (ABC)
Nginiiig!!! (2004–2006; ABS-CBN)
!Oka Tokat * (1997–2002, ; ABS-CBN)
#ParangNormal Activity (2015–2016; TV5)
Patayin sa Sindak si Barbara (2008; ABS-CBN)
Pinoy Thriller (IBC)
Pinoy True Stories: Hiwaga (2012–2014; ABS-CBN)
Regal Shocker (1985–1989; GMA, 1989–1991; IBC, 2011–2012; TV5)
Shake, Rattle & Roll: Sabado Specials (2017–2018; ABS-CBN)
Spooky Nights Presents (2011–2012, GMA)
Verum Est: Totoo ba 'to? (2001, ABS-CBN)
Viva Shockers
Wag Kukurap (2004–2006; GMA)

Lifestyle

3R (Respect, Relax, Respond) (2004–2005; GMA, 2005–2006; QTV, 2008–2009; TV5)
AHA! (2010–present; GMA)
AM @ IBC (2003–2009; IBC)
Ang Pagbabago (2006, GMA)
At Home Ka Dito (2004–2007; ABS-CBN)
  Feel at Home (2000–2004; ABS-CBN)
Ating Alamin (1980–2016; PTV/NBN, ABC, IBC)
BLOG (Barkada Log) (Studio 23)
Bodies and Motions (1994–2000; ABC)
Buhay Pinoy (2012–2019; PTV)
Business & Leisure (1998–2007; PTV/NBN)
CameraGeekTV: Pinoy Best Shot (2012–2014; PTV)
Candies (2005–2006, QTV)
Chill Spot (2008–2009; ETC)
Custom Rides (2007; IBC)
Discover Eats (2022–present; One PH)
Eateria (2009–2010, GMA)
ETC HQ (2012–2013; ETC)
ETCETERA (2011–2015; ETC)
Events Incorporated
Extra! Extra! (2003–2006, GMA)
F! (1999–2006; ABS-CBN)
Fashbook (2011–2014; GMA News TV)
Fit & Fab (2008–2010; Q)
G Diaries (2017–2020; ABS-CBN)
Gen M (ETC)
Hashtag Pinoy (2015–2019; GMA News TV)
Home Base (2012–2015; GMA News TV)
I Love Pinas (2011–2015; GMA News TV)
It's A Guy Thing
Ka-Blog! (2008–2010, GMA)
Kahanga-hangang Pilipinas (2014–2015; PTV)
Kapatid with Joel Mendez (2005–2008; ABC)
Kay Susan Tayo (2003–2009; GMA)
Kumikitang Kabuhayan (2002–2005; ABS-CBN)
Living It Up (2007–2009; Q)
Negosyo ATBP. (2005–2009; NBN)
Neighbours (2008–2011; NBN)
Out! (2004–2005, GMA)
Perfect Moments (ABS-CBN)
Philippines Tonight
Pinoy T.A.L.K. (Travel, Adventure, Leisure, Knowledge) (2011–2012; PTNI/PTV)
She..Ka! (2007–2011; NBN)
She Said, She Said (2010–2012; NBN)
StyLIZed (ETC)
Staying Alive (1980, BBC)
Tahanang Pinoy (2002–2007; ABC)
Teysi (2003–2004, ABS-CBN)
Teysi ng Tahanan (1991–1997; ABS-CBN)
The Sweet Life (2007–2011; QTV)
Tipong Pinoy (1998–1999; GMA, 2003–2004; Studio 23)
Trip na Trip (2006–2011; ABS-CBN)
TWGRR: D'World of Gandang Ricky Reyes (2005–2020; QTV/GMA News TV)
Urban Zone (2006–2012; ABS-CBN)
Us Girls (2006–2012; Studio 23)
Travel Time (1986–2015; IBC/GMA/Studio 23/ANC)
X Life (2010–2011; Q)

Music
CMV Spotlight (2018-present; INC TV/Net 25)
Hallypop Fresh (2022–present; Hallypop)
Hallypop Hits (2022–present; Hallypop)
Hallypop Lokal (2022–present; Hallypop)
Highest Praise (SMNI)
MTV Philippines (2005; IBC)
MTV Top 20 Pilipinas (2016; TV5)
MP3 (2008–2009, TV5)
Music Zone (2007; CLTV36)
MMS: My Music Station (2005–2007; QTV)
Myx (music channel)
NUTV Music Videos (1999–2001; NUTV)
Pinoy Rock MYX Videos (MYX)
Paco Park Presents (1991–2012; NBN/PTNI/PTV)
Playlist (2022-present, PIE Channel)
RJ Sunday Jam (2003–present, RJ DigiTV)
Star Music Videos (1995–2002, ABS-CBN)
SBN Karaoke (2001–2006, SBN)
SBN Music Videos (2000–2007; SBN)
Txtube (2001–2006; GMA)
UNTV Music Videos (2001–2004; UNTV)
Video Hot Tracks (1994–2000; ABC)
Music Bank (2020–present / Starting EP 1000 to I Can't Stop Me Era; Hallypop)
Simply K-Pop (2021–present; Hallypop, 2023–present; Myx)
M Countdown (2021–2022; TV5)

News
The 11:30 Report (1982–1986; GMA)
24 Oras (2004–present; GMA, 2020–present; GMA News TV/GTV, 2023–present; Pinoy Hits/I Heart Movies)
24 Oras Amianan (2015–2016; GMA Dagupan/GMA Baguio)
24 Oras Bikol (2014–2015; GMA Naga)
24 Oras Bulletin (2019; GMA)
24 Oras Central Visayas (2014–2016; GMA Cebu)
24 Oras Davao (2016–2017; GMA Davao)
24 Oras Ilokano (2014–2015; GMA Laoag)
24 Oras News Alert (2020–present; GMA)
24 Oras North Central Luzon (2014–2015; GMA Dagupan/GMA Baguio)
24 Oras Northern Mindanao (2014–2015; GMA Cagayan de Oro)
24 Oras Southern Mindanao (2014–2016; GMA Davao)
24 Oras Weekend (2010–present, GMA/GTV)
24 Oras Western Visayas (2014–2016; GMA Iloilo/GMA Bacolod)
A2Z News Alert (2020–2021; A2Z)
ABS-CBN Headlines (2000–2003; ABS-CBN)
ABS-CBN Insider (2003–2006; ABS-CBN)
ABS-CBN News Advisory (1986–2005; ABS-CBN)
Aglia Balita (2013–2020; Net 25)
Agila Pilipinas (2019–2021; Net 25)
Agila Probinsiya (2014–2021; Net 25)
Agila Reports (2003–2007; Net 25)
Aksyon (2010–2020; TV5)
Aksyon Alert (2010–2020; TV5)
Aksyon Alerto Davao (2011–2014; TV5 Davao)
Aksyon Bisaya (2011–2016; TV5 Cebu)
Aksyon Breaking (2011–2014; AksyonTV)
Aksyon Dabaw (2011–2016; TV5 Davao)
Aksyon JournalisMO (2010–2012; TV5)
Aksyon Sabado (2010–2012; TV5)
Aksyon Linggo (2010–2012; TV5)
Aksyon sa Tanghali (2014–2020; TV5)
Aksyon sa Umaga (2014–2017; TV5)
Aksyon Tonite (2014–2019; TV5)
Aksyon Weekend (2010/2013–2014, TV5)
Alas Singko Y Medya (1996–2002; ABS-CBN)
Alerto Central Luzon (2013–2016; CLTV36)
Andar ng mga Balita (2011–2014; AksyonTV)
Ang Balita Karon (ABC Davao)
Arangkada (2007–2015; GMA Iloilo)
Arangkada sa Nuwebe Davao (RPN Davao)
Arangkada sa Umaga (2016–2017; CLTV36)
At Home With GMA Regional TV (2020-present; GMA Davao)
Bagong Umaga Bagong Balita (2012–2018; ABS-CBN Dagupan)
Balita Alas Singko (2011–2019; AksyonTV)
Balita Alas Singko ng Umaga (1999–2002; ABS-CBN)
Balita ng Bansa (2016–present; SMNI News)
Balita Nuwebe Nobenta (2016–2020; Inquirer 990 Television)
Balita Pilipinas Ngayon (2011–2019; GMA News TV)
Balita Pilipinas Primetime (2011–2014; GMA News TV)
Balita sa IBC (1986–1989; IBC)
Balitaan (2013–2014; PTV)
Balitang 60 (2011–2014; AksyonTV)
Balitang A2Z (2021–present; A2Z)
Balitang America
Balitang Amianan (2008–2014/2016–2022; GMA Dagupan)
Balitang Asia-Pacific
Balitang Australia
Balitang Balita (1992–2004; ABC)
Balitang Bisdak (1999–2014/2016–present; GMA Cebu)
Balitang Central Luzon (2013–2016, 2018–2020; CLTV36)
Balitang Central Luzon Update
Balitang Europe
Balitang Global (Middle East/Europe Edition)
Balitang Ilokano (2012–2014; GMA Laoag)
Balitang Middle East
Balitaang Tapat (2010–2012; TV5)
Balitanghali (2005–present; QTV/Q/GMA News TV/GTV)
Balitanghali Weekend (2010–2020; Q/GMA News TV)
Balitang Tanghali (2019–present; DZRJ RadioVision)
Bandila (2006–2020; ABS-CBN, 2007, 2017–2019; DZMM TeleRadyo)
Balitalakayan (2021–2022; Net 25)
Bareta sa Singko
Baretang Bikol (2012–2014; GMA Naga)
Batingaw (2008–2010; NBN)
BBC/City 2 Balita (1982–1986; BBC/City2)
Big News (2004–2008; ABC)
The Big News (1961–1972, 1992–2004; ABC)
Big@10 (2017–2018; CLTV36)
Bigtime Balita (2020; GMA News TV)
Boses ng Balita (2020; GMA News TV)
Bilis Balita (2011–2014; Studio 23)
Brigada Siete (1993–2001; GMA)
Brigada Top Stories (2012–2020; Brigada News TV-34)
Buena Mano Balita (2007–2015; GMA Cebu)
Buena Manong Balita (2019–2022; GMA News TV/GTV)
Busina Balita (2019–present; CNN Philippines)
Business @ 10 (2008; NBN)
Business News (2002–2003; NBN)
BusinessWorld Live (2018–present; One News)
CLTV36 Balitaan (2007–2013, 2021-present; CLTV36)
CLTV36 Balitaan sa Umaga (2011–2013; CLTV36)
CLTV36 Flash Report (2017–present; CLTV36)
CLTV36 News (2021-present; CLTV36)
Cebuano News (2013–2017; Solar News Channel/9TV/CNN Philippines)
Central Luzon Ngayon (2018; CLTV36)
Central Luzon Ngayon Recap (2018; CLTV36)
Central Luzon Tonight (2018; CLTV36)
CNN Konek (2011–2013; AksyonTV)
CNN Philippines Balitaan (2016–present, CNN Philippines)
CNN Philippines Headline News (2015–2016; CNN Philippines)
CNN Philippines Network News (2012–2017; Solar News Channel/9TV/CNN Philippines)
CNN Philippines Newsroom (2015–present; CNN Philippines)
CNN Philippines Nightly News (2012–2016; Solar News Channel/9TV/CNN Philippines)
CNN Philippines Sports Desk (2012–present; Solar News Channel/9TV/CNN Philippines)
CNN Philippines Updates (2012–present; Solar News Channel/9TV/CNN Philippines)
CTN Midnite (1995–1998; IBC)
Daily Info (2017–2020; PTV)
Davao Express Balita (IBC Davao)
Daybreak (2012–2015; Solar News Channel/9TV)
Dobol A sa Dobol B (2017–2020; GMA News TV)
Dobol B sa News TV (2011–2012, 2017–2021; GMA News TV)
Dobol B TV (2021–present; GTV)
Dobol B:Bantay Balita sa Kamara (2019–2020; GMA News TV)
Dobol B:Bantay Balita sa Senado (2019–2020; GMA News TV)
Dobol Weng sa Dobol B (2022–present; GTV, 2023–present Pinoy Hits)
Dong Puno Live (1995–2000, 2003–2005; ABS-CBN)
DZBB Executive Summary (2020–2021; GMA News TV/GTV)
Dos Por Dos (2007–2020; DZMM Teleradyo, 2020–present; DZRH News Television)
DZRH Network News (2013–present; DZRH News Television)
DZRH Evening News (2019–present; DZRH News Television)
Eagle News Evening Edition (2011–2013; Net 25)
Eagle News International (2013–2022; Net 25)
Eagle News International Filipino Edition (2018–2021; Net 25)
Eagle News Morning Edition (2011–2013; Net 25)
Eagle News Update (2011–2022, Net 25)
Eagle News Weekend Edition (2011–2012; Net 25)
Early Evening Report (1986–1987; PTV)
Fast Break (2014–2017; S+A)
Fastbreak News (2010–2012; UNTV)
Flash Report (2002–2016; GMA)
Flash Report: Special Edition (2002–2007; GMA)
Flash Report sa QTV (2005–2007; QTV)
Flash Report sa Q (2007; Q)
Frontline Pilipinas (2020–present; TV5 & One PH)
Frontline sa Umaga (2021–present; TV5)
Frontline Tonight (2021–present; TV5)
Frontpage: Ulat ni Mel Tiangco (1999–2004; GMA)
Gising, Pilipinas! (2007–2020; DZMM TeleRadyo; 2010, ABS-CBN)
Global Conversations (2015–2016; CNN Philippines)
Global News (1998–2003; ABS-CBN)
GMA Balita (1986–1998; GMA)
GMA Evening Report (1974–1976; GMA)
GMA Headline News (1986–1992; GMA)
GMA Network News (1992–2002; GMA)
GMA News Digest (1976–1987; GMA)
GMA News Live (1987–2002; GMA)
GMA News Update (2016–2018; GMA)
GMA Regional TV Early Edition (2020–present; GMA Iloilo)
GMA Regional TV Live! (2020–present; GMA Cebu)
GMA Weekend Report (2007–2010, GMA)
Good Morning Club (2012–2014; TV5)
Good Morning, Ser! (2014; TV5)
Hataw Balita (2005–2013, 2016–2017; UNTV)
Hataw Balita Pilipinas (2020–present; UNTV)
Hataw Balita News Update (2008–2012; UNTV)
Hataw Balita Newsbreak (2012–2016; UNTV/UNTV Life)
Headline Pilipinas (2016–present; DZMM TeleRadyo)
Headline Trese (1989–1992, 1997–1998; IBC)
I-Balita (2007–2011; Net 25)
I-News (2008–2011; Net 25)
Iba-Balita (2010–2014; Studio 23)
Iba-Balita Ngayon (2011–2012; Studio 23)
IBC Balita Ngayon (1998–2000; IBC)
IBC News 11 O'Clock Report (1992–1995; IBC)
IBC Express Balita (1998–2011, 2022–present; IBC)
IBC Headliners (1994–2011, 2021; IBC)
IBC News 5:30 Report (1992–1995; IBC)
IBC News 5:30 Report Cebu (1992–1995; IBC Cebu)
IBC News Tonight (2002–2011; IBC)
IBC News Tonight Cebuano Edition (2002–2003; IBC Cebu)
IBC News Tonight Karon Cebu  (2003–2011; IBC Cebu)
IBC NewsBreak (2014–2018; IBC)
IBC Newsday (1975–1986; IBC)
IBC Special Report (2022–present; IBC)
IBC TV X-Press (1995–1997; IBC)
IBC TV X-Press Cebu (1995; IBC Cebu)
IBC TV X-Press Karon (1995–1996; IBC Cebu)
In the Limelight (2011; GMA News TV)
Islands TV Newsbreak (1991–1992; IBC)
Ito Ang Balita (2004–present; UNTV/UNTV Life/UNTV)
Junior Patrol (1990–1992; ABS-CBN)
Jr. News (RPN)
Kada Umaga (2021–present; Net 25)
Kapampangan News (2014–2017; Solar News Channel/9TV/CNN Philippines)
Kape at Balita (1991–1993; GMA, 2012–2013; GMA News TV)
KBS Spot Check (1969–1973; KBS)
Late Evening Report (1986–1987; RPN)
Live on Q (2007–2011; Q)
Liwanag sa Balita (2019–2020; GMA News TV)
Malacañang: The Week That Was (2008–2010; NBN)
Masayang Umaga Po! (2015–2017; Net 25)
Mata ng Agila (2011–present; Net 25)
Mata ng Agila International (2022–present; Net 25)
Mata ng Agila Weekend (2012–present; Net 25)
May Tamang Balita (2011–2013; GMA News TV)
Melo del Prado sa Super Radyo DZBB (2019–present; GMA News TV/GTV)
Metro Central Luzon Ngayon (2016–2018; CLTV36)
Metro Central Luzon Tonite (2016–2017; CLTV36)
Metro Central Luzon Update (2016–2017; CLTV36)
Metro Central Luzon Weekend Recap (2017–2018; CLTV36)
Metro One (2012–2013; PTV)
Mga Balita ni Efren Montes (1972–1973; KBS)
Midnight Update (1987–1989; PTV)
Minuto (2007–2010; NBN)
MMDA sa GMA (2019–2020; GMA News TV)
Money Matters (2008–2010; NBN)
Mornings with GMA Regional TV (2021–present; GMA Regional TV North Central Luzon)
National Network News (1998–2001; PTV)
NBN Business (2005–2006; NBN)
NBN Network News (2001–2005; NBN)
NBN News Live (2001–2007; NBN)
Nescafé Morning News (sponsored by Nescafé) (1987–1989; ABS-CBN)
Net 25 News Update (2022–present; Net 25)
New Day (2016–present; CNN Philippines)
News on 4 (1987–1995; PTV)
News5 Alerts (2020–present; TV5)
Newsbreak Bilingual (1995–1998; PTV)
Newsday (2012–2015; Solar News Channel/9TV)
NewsCenter 4 (1980–1986; MBS)
Newsday Cebu (1982–1990; IBC Cebu)
News 23 (1996–1998; Studio 23)
News @ 1 (2012–2016; PTV)
News @ 1: The Week that Was (2013–2014; PTV)
News @ 6 (2012–2016; PTV)
News at Seven (1976–1986; GMA)
News Bites (1999–2010; Studio 23)
News Central (1998–2010; Studio 23)
News Flash sa 4 (1998–2001; PTV)
News Light (2011–2019; Light TV)
News Light sa Umaga
News Night (2017–present; CNN Philippines, 2022–present; All TV)
News on 4 (1987–1995; PTV)
News on 7 (GMA Davao)
News on Q (2005–2011; QTV/Q)
News Patrol (2005–2020; ABS-CBN, 2020; TeleRadyo, 2020–present; Kapamilya Channel, 2022–present; A2Z)
News Patrol Davao (ABS-CBN Davao)
News Patrol Kapampangan (2018–2019; ABS-CBN Pampanga)
News.PH Kasama si Pia Hontiveros (2020–present; CNN Philippines)
News TV Quick Response Team (2011–2021; GMA News TV)
News Team 13 (2011–2019; IBC)
News to Go (2011–2019; GMA News TV)
News plus (2014, S+A)
Newsbeat (2004–2007; Net 25)
Newsblast (SMNI)
NewsLife (2012–2016; PTV)
Newsline Mindanao (2006–2010; ACQ-KBN/SMNI)
Newsline World (2011–present; SMNI)
Newsroom Ngayon (2017–present; CNN Philippines)
News Today (1974–1980; GTV)
NewsWatch (1970–2012; RPN)
NewsWatch First Edition (2008–2009; RPN)
NewsWatch Second Edition (2008–2009; RPN)
Nuebe Patrol (produced by MIT-RTVN, Inc.) (2009–2014; ABS-CBN Pagadian)
Omaga-Diaz Report (2014–present; DZMM TeleRadyo)
On the Spot (2017–present; DZMM TeleRadyo)
One Balita Pilipinas (2019–2020; TV5, 2019–present; One PH)
One Balita Ngayon (2021–present; One PH)
One Balita Weekend (2022–present; One PH)
One North Central Luzon (2022–present; GMA Regional TV North Central Luzon)
One Mindanao (2017–present; GMA Regional TV Mindanao)
One News Now (2018–present; One News)
One News World (2019–present; One News)
One Newsroom (2019–present; One News)
One Western Visayas (2018–present; GMA Regional TV Western Visayas)
Palawan TV Patrol (1997–2006; ABS-CBN Palawan)
Pambansang Almusal (2011–2021, Net 25)
Pambansang Balita (1998–2001; PTV)
Pangunahing Balita (1962–1972; ABC, 1987–1998; PTV)
Pangunahing Balita Ala-Una (1987–1998; PTV)
Pasada Ala-Una (2016–2017; CLTV36)
Pasada Balita (2017–2018; CLTV36)
Pasada Sais Trenta (2007–2020; DZMM TeleRadyo)
Pasada Sais Trenta Sabado (2007–2014; DZMM TeleRadyo)
Pilipinas News (2012–2014; TV5)
Pintig Balita (2007–2020; DZMM TeleRadyo)
Primera Balita (2009–2015; GMA Dagupan)
PNA Newsroom (2017–2022; PTV/IBC)
Primetime Balita (2000–2001; RPN)
PTV Balita Ngayon (2020–present; PTV)
PTV News (1995–1998, 2016–2017, 2017–2020; PTV)
PTV Newsbreak (1989–1998, 2012–2020; PTV)
PTV News Bacolod (1995–1998; PTV Bacolod)
PTV News Cebu (1995–1998; PTV Cebu)
PTV News Headlines (2017–2020; PTV)
PTV News Mindanao (2017–present; PTV)
PTV News Nationwide (1995–1998; PTV)
PTV News Tonight (2020–present; PTV)
PTV Weekend Report (1987–1994; PTV)
Pulso: Aksyon Balita (1999–2000, ABS-CBN)
Radyo Bandido Balita (2022–present; Radyo Bandido TV)
Radyo Patrol Balita (2007–2020; DZMM TeleRadyo)
Radyo Patrol Balita Alas-Dose (2007–2019; DZMM TeleRadyo)
Radyo Patrol Balita Alas-Kwatro (2007–2017; DZMM TeleRadyo)
Radyo Patrol Balita Alas-Siyete (2007–2020; DZMM TeleRadyo)
Radyo Patrol Balita Linggo (2011–2018; DZMM TeleRadyo)
Radyo5 Network News (2020–2021; TV5 & 2020–present; One PH)
RadyoBisyon (2014–2017; PTV & IBC)
Ratsada 24 Oras (1999–2015; GMA Iloilo)
Regional TV News (2021–present; GTV; 2023–present; Pinoy Hits)
Regional TV Weekend News (2019–2021; GMA News TV/GTV)
Ronda Brigada (2013–present; Brigada News TV-34)
Ronda Trese (2000–2002; IBC)
RPN Arangkada Balita (2000–2006; RPN)
RPN i-Watch News (2007–2008; RPN)
RPN News Update (2003–2008; RPN)
RPN NewsWatch Junior Edition (2008–2009; RPN)
RPN NewsBreak (1982–1989, 1994–2003; RPN)
RPN NewsCap (2009–2012; RPN)
RPN NewsWatch Aksyon Balita (2006–2008; RPN)
Rush (2019–present; One News)
Rush Hour (2018–2019; One News)
Sa Totoo Lang (2019–present; One PH)
Saksi (1995–present; GMA, 2020–present; GMA News TV/GTV, 2023–present; Pinoy Hits)
Saksi sa Dobol B (2011–2012; 2017–present, GMA News TV/GTV, 2023–present Pinoy Hits)
Sakto (2014-2020, 2020-present; TeleRadyo, 2020–present; Kapamilya Channel)
Sapul sa Singko (2010–2012; TV5)
The Score (2014–2020, S+A)
Sentro (2004–2008; ABC)
Sentro Balita (2017–present; PTV)
Sic O'Clock News (1987–1990; 2019, IBC)
SMNI Newsline Philippines (2006–2011; SMNI)
State of the Nation (2011–present; GMA News TV/GTV)
Super Balita sa Tanghali Nationwide (2020, GMA News TV)
Super Balita sa Umaga Nationwide (2011–2012, 2017–present, GMA News TV/GTV)
Super Balita sa Umaga Weekend (2017–present; GMA News TV/GTV, 2023–present Pinoy Hits)
Super Radyo Nationwide (2019–2020; GMA News TV)
Talking Points : Ang Tinig ng Serbisyo Publiko (2011; NBN)
TeleDyaryo (2001–2012; NBN/PTNI/PTV)
TeleDyaryo 4:30pm (2004–2006; NBN)
TeleDyaryo 5:00pm (2006–2008; NBN)
TeleDyaryo Final Edition (2005–2008, 2010–2012; NBN/PTNI/PTV)
TeleDyaryo Business (2006–2008, 2010–2012; NBN/PTNI/PTV)
TeleDyaryo ng Bayan (2005–2007; NBN)
TeleDyaryo Panlalawigan (2005–2008; NBN)
TeleDyaryo Primetime (2005–2008; NBN)
TeleDyaryo Alas-Dose (2007–2008; NBN)
TeleDyaryo Ala-Una (2001–2004; NBN)
TeleDyaryo Alas-Nuwebe (2005–2008; NBN)
TeleDyaryo Ala-Sais (2001–2004; NBN)
TeleDyaryo Sabado (2005–2007; NBN)
TeleDyaryo Linggo (2005–2007; NBN)
TeleDyaryo Weekend (2009–2012; NBN/PTNI/PTV)
TeleRadyo Balita (2001–2020; DZMM Radyo Patrol 630, 2007-2020, 2020–present; TeleRadyo, 2020–present; Kapamilya Channel)
TeleRadyo Balita Weekend (2020–2022; TeleRadyo)
Testigo (1999–2014; GMA Davao)
TEN: The Evening News (2008–2010; TV5)
The Big Story (2018–present; One News, 2019; TV5)
The DPI Mid-Day Report (1978; PTV)
The Final Report (1997–1998; PTV)
The Final Word with Rico Hizon (2020–present; CNN Philippines)
The Hour Updates (1989–1994; RPN)
The News with Uncle Bob (1961–1972; RBS)
The Saturday Report (RPN)
The Sunday Report (RPN)
The Weekend News (2012–2016; PTV)
This Week Tonight (1977–1989; RPN)
Todo Balita (2007–2010; DZMM TeleRadyo, 2010; ABS-CBN)
Tutok 13 (2019–present; IBC)
TV Patrol (1987–2004/2010–2020; ABS-CBN, 2020–present; ANC, 2007–2020, 2020–present; TeleRadyo, 2020–present; Kapamilya Channel, 2022–present; A2Z)
TV Patrol 4 (1988–1994; ABS-CBN Bacolod)
TV Patrol Bacolod (2001–2007; ABS-CBN Bacolod)
TV Patrol Baguio (1995–2000; ABS-CBN Baguio)
TV Patrol Bicol (2005–2020; ABS-CBN Naga)
TV Patrol Cagayan De Oro (1995–2000; ABS-CBN Cagayan De Oro)
TV Patrol Cebu (1988–2000; ABS-CBN Cebu)
TV Patrol Central Visayas (2000–2020; ABS-CBN Cebu)
TV Patrol Chavacano (2000–2020; ABS-CBN Zamboanga)
TV Patrol Davao (1997–2001; ABS-CBN Davao)
TV Patrol Dumaguete (1995–2006; ABS-CBN Cebu)
TV Patrol Eastern Visayas (2018–2020; ABS-CBN Tacloban)
TV Patrol General Santos (1996–2000; ABS-CBN General Santos)
TV Patrol Iligan (1999–2006; ABS-CBN Iligan)
TV Patrol Iloilo (2001–2011; ABS-CBN Iloilo)
TV Patrol Legazpi (1997–2005; ABS-CBN Naga)
TV Patrol Mindanao (1989–1997, 2001–2005; ABS-CBN Davao)
TV Patrol Naga (1996–2005; ABS-CBN Naga)
TV Patrol North Luzon (2018–2020; ABS-CBN Baguio)
TV Patrol North Mindanao (2018–2020; ABS-CBN Cagayan De Oro)
TV Patrol Northern Luzon (2000–2018; ABS-CBN Baguio)
TV Patrol Northern Mindanao (2000–2018; ABS-CBN Cagayan De Oro)
TV Patrol Palawan (2011–2020; ABS-CBN Palawan)
TV Patrol Pampanga (2006–2018; ABS-CBN Pampanga)
TV Patrol Panay (2011–2020; ABS-CBN Iloilo)
TV Patrol Socsksargen (2000–2018; ABS-CBN General Santos)
TV Patrol South Central Mindanao (2018–2020; ABS-CBN General Santos)
TV Patrol Southern Mindanao (2005–2020; ABS-CBN Davao)
TV Patrol Southern Tagalog (2009–2020; ABS-CBN Batangas)
TV Patrol Tacloban (1997–2018; ABS-CBN Tacloban)
TV Patrol Western Visayas (1994–2001; ABS-CBN Bacolod, 1998–2001; ABS-CBN Iloilo)
TV Patrol Zamboanga (1995–2000; ABS-CBN Zamboanga)
TV Patrol Weekend (2010–2020; ABS-CBN, 2020–present; ANC, 2007–2010, 2020–present; TeleRadyo, 2020–present; Kapamilya Channel, 2022–present; A2Z)
TV Patrol Sabado (2004–2010; ABS-CBN) 
TV Patrol Linggo (2004–2010; ABS-CBN) 
TV Patrol World (2004–2010; ABS-CBN)
UNTV C-News (2016–present, UNTV)
UNTV Hataw Balita (2005–2017; UNTV)
UNTV Newsbreak (2016–present; UNTV)
UNTV News (2012–2016; UNTV/UNTV Life)
Ulat A2Z (2021–present; A2Z)
Ulat Bayan (2017–present; PTV)
Ulat Bayan Weekend (2017–present; PTV, 2023–present; IBC)
Umagang Kay Ganda (2007–2020, ABS-CBN)
Una Ka Bai: Balita at Iba pa (GMA Davao)
Unang Balita (1999–present, GMA)
Wazzup Wazzup (2004–2007, Studio 23)
Why News (2015–present, UNTV/UNTV Life/UNTV)
The Weekend News with Ramon Bautista (2008–2009; TV5)
The Weekend News (1995–2004: ABS-CBN, 2012–2016; PTV)
The Weekender World (2006–2009; SMNI)
The World Tonight (1966–1972, 1986–1999; ABS-CBN, 1996–present; ANC, 2020–present; Kapamilya Channel)

Reality and talent search

30 Days (2004; GMA)
Ang Bagong Kampeon (1985–1988,  RPN)
Ano Bang Trip Mo?
Bet ng Bayan (2014; GMA)
Born Diva (2004–2005; ABS-CBN)
Born to Be a Star (2016, 2021; TV5)
Catch Me Out Philippines (2021; GMA)
Centerstage (2020–2021; GMA)
 Day Off (2005–2019; QTV/Q/GMA News TV)
Dream Maker: Search for the Next Global Pop Group (2022–2023; Kapamilya Channel/A2Z, 2023; TV5/PIE Channel)
Extra Challenge (1999–2006, 2012–2013; GMA)
Extreme Makeover (2012; TV5)
GEN M Generation Mega
Here Comes The Bride
Hollywood Boot Camp
Hollywood Dream (2005; ABC)
I Am Meg (2012–2014; ETC)
Idol Philippines (2019; ABS-CBN, 2022–present; Kapamilya Channel, A2Z/TV5)
In the Loop (CgeTV, ABS-CBN)
It's A Guy Thing
Juan Direction (2013–2014; AksyonTV)
Kamao: Matira ang Matibay (2005)
Kap's Amazing Stories (2007–2014; GMA)
Kap's Amazing Stories Kids Edition (2010; GMA)
Kwentong Talentado (2009–2010; TV5)
Little Big Shots (2017; ABS-CBN)
Little Big Star (2005–2007; ABS-CBN)
Little Big Superstar (2007; ABS-CBN)
Lip Sync Battle Philippines (2016–2018; GMA)
Mga Kwento ni Marc Logan (2014–2017, ABS-CBN)
MEGA Fashion Crew (2011–2014; ETC)
Move: The Search for Billy Crawford's Pinoy Dancers (2007; GMA)
MTV Superstah (2004)
Na-Scam Ka Na Ba? (2005–2006, QTV)
On-Air (2001–2004; ABC, 2005; IBC)
Pasikatan: CLTV36 Talent Search (2015; CLTV36)
Perfect Moments (2005, ABS-CBN)
Philippine Idol (2006, ABC)
Philippines' Next Top Model (2007; RPN, 2017; TV5)
Pilipinas Got Talent (2010–2018; ABS-CBN, 2023; Kapamilya Channel, A2Z/TV5)
Pinoy Big Brother (2005–2019; ABS-CBN, 2020–Present; Kapamilya Channel/A2Z)
Pinoy Dream Academy (2006–2008; ABS-CBN)
Pinoy Fear Factor (2008–2009; ABS-CBN)
Pinoy Idol (2008; GMA)
Pinoy Pop Superstar (2004–2007; GMA)
Planet X (2001–2003; ABC)
Popstar Kids (2005–2007; QTV)
Project Runway Philippines (2008; ETC)
Qpids (2005; ABS-CBN)
Rivermaya: Bagong Liwanag (2007–2008; Studio 23)
Running Man Philippines (2022; GMA)
Search for a Star (2003–2004; GMA)
Search for the Star in a Million (2005–2006; ABS-CBN)
Shall We Dance? (2005–2010; ABC/TV5)
Shoot That Babe
Sing Galing! (1998–2005; ABC)
Sing Galing! (2021–present; TV5)
Sing-ka-Galing! (2017; CLTV36)
Single (2002–2004; ABC, 2005; IBC)
Star for a Night (2002–2003; IBC)
Star in a Million (2003–2004; ABS-CBN)
Star Circle Quest (2004–2011; ABS-CBN)
Star Mill (2013, 2014; CLTV36)
StarDance: The Search for the Dance Idol (2005; ABS-CBN)
Star Factor (2010; TV5)
Stars on Ice (2007; Q)
StarStruck (2003–2019; GMA)
StarStruck Kids (2004; GMA)
Strangebrew (2001–2003; UNTV)
Survivor Philippines (2008–2012; GMA)
Talentadong Pinoy (2008–2021; TV5)
Tanghalan ng Kampeon
Tawag ng Tanghalan (1953–1972, 1987–1988; ABS-CBN)
Tawag ng Tanghalan sa Showtime (2016–2020; ABS-CBN, 2020–present; Kapamilya Channel, A2Z/Jeepney TV, 2022-present; TV5)
The Clash (2018–present; GMA)
Three Blind Dates (2004–2005; ABC)
Turquoise Street
U Can Dance (2006–2007; ABS-CBN)
Victim (2003–2004; ABS-CBN)
Victim Extreme (2004–2005; ABS-CBN)
Victim Undercover (2004; ABS-CBN)
The Voice of the Philippines (2013–2015; ABS-CBN)
The Voice Kids (2014–2019; ABS-CBN, 2023–present; Kapamilya Channel,A2Z/TV5)
The Voice Teens (2017–2020; ABS-CBN/Kapamilya Channel)
World of Dance Philippines (2019; ABS-CBN)

Religious

 3 O'Clock Divine Mercy Prayer (1986–2014; PTV/NBN/PTNI/PTV)
100 Days to Heaven (2011; ABS-CBN)
The 700 Club Asia (1994–present)
Agua Bendita (2010; ABS-CBN)
Ang Dating Daan (2004–present; UNTV)
Ang Pagbubunyag (2012–present; INC TV and Net 25)
Asin at Ilaw (2000–2007 RPN, 2008–2011 IBC)
Batang Kaharian
Beyond Today (GMA News TV) (2016–2018)
Bro. Eddie Villanueva Classics (2020–present; A2Z/Light TV)
Cathedral of Praise with David Sumrall (1986–1992; ABS-CBN, 1992–1995; ABC, 1995–2004; GMA)
Community Mass on ABC (2004–2008; ABC)
Divine Mercy Live TV Mass (2003–2007; NBN)
D' X-Man Former Iglesia ni Cristo members (2004–2017,2017–present, UNTV)
Dr.Love (2007–2022; DZMM TeleRadyo/TeleRadyo)
Ecclesia in Asia: Ang Misa (2000–2010; GMA)
 Family Land's Children Show (2006–2008; ABC)
Family Matters (produced by Family Rosary Crusade) (2010–2014; PTV, 2010–2016; TV5)
Family Rosary Crusade (1987–2003; ABS-CBN, 1992–2008; ABC, 1989–2014; PTV, 1987–2007; RPN, 2003–2018; Studio 23 
Family TV Mass (2002–2014, 2015–2019; IBC-13, 2019–present; 5 Plus 
Feast TV (2019–present, IBC and One PH)
Friends Again (1999–2007; IBC, 2003–2007; RPN, 2003–2007; SBN, 2007–2008; NBN, 2008–2014; Studio 23, 2014–2020; S+A) 
Gabay sa Mabuting Asal (1999-2002; GMA; 2001-2005, 2012-present; Net 25; 2012-present; GEM TV/INC TV)
Heart to Heart Talk (1992–2007; RPN, 2008–2011; PTV)
Huwag Kang Mangamba (2021; Kapamilya Channel, A2Z, TV5/Jeepney TV)
In Touch with Dr. Charles Stanley (1992–2004, 2008–present; GMA  2013–2018; Light TV 2018–2019; CNN Philippines; 2019–present TV5)
Itanong Mo Kay Soriano (2004–present; UNTV)
Jesus the Healer (1989–1999, 2006–2019; GMA, 1998–present; Light TV, 2021–present; A2Z)
JESUS Miracle Crusade International Ministry (2007–present; PTV)
JMM Covers (2014–2015; PTV)
Kapamilya Daily Mass (2020; ABS-CBN/S+A, 2020–present; Kapamilya Channel/TeleRadyo, 2021–present; Jeepney TV)
Kapamilya Journey's of Hope (2021–present; TeleRadyo)
Kapamilya Sunday Mass (2021–present; Jeepney TV)
Kasama Natin ang Diyos (2013–2014, PTV)
Kape't Pandasal (2004–2020; ABS-CBN)
Kerygma TV (2003–2007; RPN/SBN, 2007–2010; ABC/TV5, 2011–2019; IBC)
Life Giver (2012–2022; Light TV)
Light Up (2011–present; Light TV)
Mama Mary Holy Mass (2008–2010; NBN)
Mapalad Ang Bumabasa (2005–2016; UNTV)
Men of Light
May Bukas Pa (2000–2001; IBC/RPN)
May Bukas Pa (2009–2010; ABS-CBN)
Nathaniel (2015; ABS-CBN)
Midnight Prayer Helps (2006–2020; Light TV)
One Prayer
Oras ng Himala (2007–2021; NBN/PTNI/PTV)
Oras ng Katotohanan (2001–2018; IBC)
Prayer For The Holy Souls in Purgatory (2002–2014; NBN/PTNI/PTV)
Pasugo: Ang Tinig Ng Iglesia Ni Cristo (1999–2002; PTV/NBN, 2002–2005; GMA; 2001-2005, 2001-2005, 2010-present; Net 25; 2005-present; GEM TV/INC TV)
PJM Forum (1998–2020; Light TV)
Powerline (1995–2007; SMNI)
 Saint Peregrine TV Sunday Mass (1989–2008; IBC)
Signs and Wonders (2007–2008; ABC)
Shalom (1979–2007; RPN, 2017–2018; IBC)
 Sharing in the City (1979–2007; RPN)
Sounds of Worship
Start Your Day The Christian Way (2005–2011; UNTV)
Sunday Mass on ABC (1992–2004; ABC)
Sunday TV Healing Mass (2006–2014; Studio 23, 2014–present; CNN Philippines)
Sunday TV Mass (1990–2007; ABS-CBN)
T.A.H.O (Tawanan at Awitan kay Hesus Oras-oras) (1993–1996; IBC)
Talitha Kum Healing Mass on TV (2002–2019; NBN/PTNI/PTV)
Truth in Focus (2004–present; UNTV)
The Key of David (2012–2019; PTV, 2022–present; GTV)
 Three Minutes a Day (produced by Family Rosary Crusade) (2002–2008; ABC)
The Chaplet of the Divine Mercy (1985–2007; RPN, 1992–2008; ABC, 1986–2014; PTV)
The Healing Eucharist (2007–2020; ABS-CBN, 2020; S+A, 2012–present; Jeepney TV, 2020–present; Kapamilya Channel, 2020, 2021–present; TeleRadyo)
The Message (2012–present; INC TV)
This is Your Day (2001–2011; IBC)
Usapang Kapatid (2007–2020; DZMM TeleRadyo)
Visita Iglesia (2013–present; GMA Regional TV)
Who's Calling (2015–2017; PTV)
The Word Exposed with Luis Antonio Cardinal Tagle (2008–2010; TV5, 2010–2014; Studio 23 , 2010–present; PTV, 2010-present; ANC)

Soap operas

Adarna (2013–2014; GMA)
Anak ni Waray vs. Anak ni Biday (2020-2021; GMA)
Anna Luna (1989–1994; ABS-CBN, 1994–1995; RPN)
Anna Liza (1980–1986; GMA)
Annaliza (2013; ABS-CBN)
Asintado (2018; ABS-CBN)
Babaeng Hampaslupa (2011; TV5)
Bakekang (2006–2007; GMA)
Bituing Walang Ningning (2006; ABS-CBN)
Bridges of Love (2015; ABS-CBN)
Crazy for You (2006; ABS-CBN)
Esperanza (1997–1999; ABS-CBN)
Flordeluna (1980s; RPN)
Maria Flordeluna (2007; ABS-CBN)
Gulong ng Palad (2006; ABS-CBN)
Habang May Buhay (2010; ABS-CBN)
The Half Sisters (2014–2016; GMA)
Hanggang Kailan (2004; GMA)
Hiram (2004; ABS-CBN)
I Luv NY (2006; GMA)
Ikaw ang Lahat sa Akin (2005; ABS-CBN)
Impostora (2007; GMA)
It Might Be You (2003–2004; ABS-CBN)
Kadenang Ginto (2018–2020; ABS-CBN)
Kambal Karibal (2017–2018; GMA)
Kambal Sirena (2014; GMA)
Kung Mawawala Ka (2002–2003; GMA)
Legacy (2012; GMA)
Lobo (2008; ABS-CBN)
Maging Sino Ka Man (2006–2007; ABS-CBN)
Maging Sino Ka Man: Ang Pagbabalik (2007–2008; ABS-CBN)
Makulay Ng Daigdig ni Nora (1974)
Mara Clara (1992–1997; ABS-CBN)
Mara Clara (remake) 2010–2011)
MariMar (2007–2008; GMA)
MariMar (remake) (2015–2016)
Mula Sa Puso (1997–1999; ABS-CBN)
Mula Sa Puso (remake) (2011)
My Driver Sweet Lover (2010; TV5)
Nagbabagang Bulaklak (Danceserye)
Onanay (2018–2019; GMA)
Once Upon a Kiss (2015; GMA)
Pangako Sa 'Yo (2000–2002; ABS-CBN)
Pangako Sa 'Yo (remake) (2015–2016)
Pangarap na Bituin (2007; ABS-CBN)
Paraiso Ko'y Ikaw (2014; GMA)
Pari 'Koy (2015; GMA)
Sa Dulo Ng Walang Hanggan (2001–2003; ABS-CBN)
Sa Piling Mo (2006; ABS-CBN)
Sana Maulit Muli (2007; ABS-CBN)
Sandugo (2019–2020; ABS-CBN)
Sarah The Teen Princess (2004; ABS-CBN)
Second Chances (2015; GMA)
Since I Found You (2018; ABS-CBN)
Te Amo, Maging Sino Ka Man (2004)
The Good Son (2017–2018; ABS-CBN)
Twin Hearts (2003–2004; GMA)
Vietnam Rose (2005–2006; ABS-CBN)
Villa Quintana (1994–1996; GMA)
Villa Quintana (remake) (2013–2014)
Walang Kapalit (2007; ABS-CBN)
Ysabella (2007–2008; ABS-CBN)

Sports

Auto Focus (1998–2005; PTV/NBN)
Auto Review (2001–present; NBN/PTNI/PTV, 2003–2007; RPN)
Aksyon Sports (2011–2020; AksyonTV/One PH)
Astig PBA (2007–2008; ABC)
Badminton Extreme
Basta Sports (2006; ABS-CBN)
Body & Machine (2001–2007; RPN)
Bakbakan Na (2013–2017; IBC)
Bigtime Bakbakan (2011–2013; IBC)
Buhay PBA (2007–2008; ABC)
CBA - Pilipinas (2019–2020; IBC/Light TV)
Chicken Talk (2016–2019; IBC)
Extreme Games 101 (2005–2007; RPN)
Eumorpho Lakas Tao
Fistorama (2002–2011; NBN, 2003–2007; RPN)
Game Na!
Gameplan (2007; RPN)
GG Blitz (2018–2019, TV5; 2019, 5 Plus)
Golf Power (2003–2005; RPN)
Golf Power Plus (2005–2007; RPN)
Hataw Pinoy (2006–2011; IBC)
Hotwire
I-PBA (2006–2007; ABC)
I-Sport Lang (2019–2020; One PH)
In This Corner (2001–2015; PTV/NBN, 2003–2007; RPN)
Liga Pilipinas (2008–2009; NBN)
Mano-Mano Pro-Boksing (IBC)
MPBL (2017–2020; S+A, 2019; ABS-CBN, 2020-2021; A2Z, 2021-2022; IBC, 2022-present; One PH)
MBA (1998–2002, Studio 23)
Motoring Today (1987–2006, 2008–2009; NBN, 2009–present; Solar Sports)
National Basketball Association
NBA on ABC (2007–2008; ABC)
NBA on ABS-CBN (1986–1988, 2011–2019; ABS-CBN)
NBA on BTV (2006–2019; Basketball TV)
NBA on Citynet (1995–1996; Citynet Television)
NBA on CNN Philippines (2019–2020; CNN Philippines)
NBA on C/S (2008–2009; C/S)
NBA on GMA (1988–1996; GMA)
NBA on IBC (1996–2001, 2002–2004; IBC)
NBA on NBN (2001–2002; NBN)
NBA on One Sports (2020–present; TV5/One Sports)
NBA on RPN (2004–2007; RPN)
NBA on S+A (2014–2019; S+A)
NBA on Solar Sports (2002–2006; Solar Sports)
NBA on Solar TV (2009–2011; Solar TV)
NBA on Studio 23 (2011–2014; Studio 23)
NBA on TV5 (2020–present; TV5)
National Basketball Conference (2004–2008)
NBL
NBN Sports (2008–2010; NBN)
NCAA (2002–2011, 2015–2020; S+A, 2012; IBC, 2013–2015; TV5/Aksyon TV, 2021–present; GTV)
News TV All Sports (2011–2018; GMA News TV)
Pagcor Jai-Alai (2009–2010; IBC)
Philippine Basketball Association
PBA on ABC (2004–2008; ABC/TV5)
PBA on AKTV (2011–2013; IBC)
PBA on BBC (1976; BBC)
PBA on ESPN 5 (2017–2020; TV5)
PBA on KBS (1975–1977; KBS)
PBA on MBS (1978–1981; GTV/MBS)
PBA on NBN/IBC (2003; NBN/IBC)
PBA on One Sports (2020–present; TV5/One Sports)
PBA on Solar Sports (2008–2011; Solar Sports)
PBA on Sports5 (2013–2017; TV5)
PBA on Vintage Sports (1982–1983; BBC, 1984–1995; MBS/PTV, 1996–1999; IBC)
PBA on Viva TV (2000–2002; IBC)
PBA Classics (2006–2008; ABC)
Philippine Basketball League (2008–2011; RPN)
Pilipinas Sabong Sports (2005–2009; IBC)
Pinoy Wrestling (1993–2002; RJTV)
Pool Showdown (2007–2008; ABC)
Premier Volleyball League (2017–2020; S+A, 2021–present; One Sports)
Primetime Sports
PTV Sports (2012–2016, 2017–present; PTV)
Ringside (2004–2008; ABC)
Sagupaan TV (IBC, Studio 23, 2014–2020; S+A, 2020–present; One Sports)
Salpukan 360 (2017–2018; IBC/TV5)
Sargo (2007; RPN)
Shakey's V-League (2004–2005, 2012; IBC, 2005–2006; ABC, 2007–2011; NBN, 2013–2015; GMA News TV, 2016; S+A)
Shakey's Super League (2022–present; IBC/Solar Sports)
Silip sa Karera
Sports 37 (2007–2016; UNTV/UNTV Life)
Sports Pilipinas (2012–2014; GMA News TV)
SportsCenter Philippines (2017–2020; TV5)
Sports Desk (2013–2015; Solar News Channel/9TV)
Sports List (2005–2007; NBN)
Sports Review (1991–2005; RPN)
Sports U: Ikaw ang Panalo! (2015–2020; ABS-CBN)
Sports Unlimited (1997–2015; ABS-CBN)
Stoplight TV (2009–2010, TV5)
Taekwondo TV (2006–2010, Studio 23)
The Basketball Show (2005–2007; RPN)
The Chasedown (2019–present; One PH)
Teledyaryo Sports (2006–2008/2010–2012; NBN/PTNI/PTV)
Tennis Review
The Main Event (produced by Viva Sports 2002–2003, 2008–2013; IBC)
The Nationals (2018-present, 5 Plus/One Sports)
Thunderbird Sabong Nation (2013–2014; Studio 23, 2014–2017; IBC, 2017–2019; S+A, 2019–2020; TV5, 2020–present; One Sports)
Tukaan at Kabuhayan (1998–2017; IBC, 2017–2020; TV5, 2020–present; One Sports)
UAAP (1979–1988; IBC, 1989–1994; RPN, 1995–1999; PTV, 2000–2020; Studio 23/S+A)
Unlimited Diving (2003–2009; NBN)
United Football League (2011–2013; IBC)
Woman in Action (2022–present; One News/One PH)

Talk shows

3-in-1 (2015; ABS-CBN)
All About You (2003–2004; GMA)
Actually, Yun Na!  (1994–1996; RPN)
Ang Latest (2012–2013; TV5)
Anim na Dekada... Nag-iisang Vilma (2023; Kapamilya Channel/A2Z)
Aquino & Abunda Tonight (2014–2015; ABS-CBN)
Balitalakay (2008–2010; NBN)
Boy & Kris (2007–2009; ABS-CBN)
The Buzz (1999–2013/2014–2015; ABS-CBN)
Buzz ng Bayan (2013–2014; ABS-CBN)
Call Me Papa Jack (2015; TV5)
CelebriTV (2015–2016; GMA)
Celebrity Turns with Junie Lee and Lani Misalucha (2003–2004, GMA)
Chikka Mo, Chikka Ko (2004–2008, UNTV)
Chika, Besh! (2020–2021, TV5)
ChisMax: Chismis to the Max! (2009–2020; DZMM TeleRadyo)
Citizen Pinoy (2005; ANC)
Cristy Ferminute (2011–present; AksyonTV/One PH)
Dagundong (2005–2008; NBN)
Daily Chikahan (2014–2016; CLTV36)
Daybreak (2012–2015; Solar News Channel/9TV)
formerly known as Solar Daybreak
Debate with Mare at Pare (1998–2006; GMA)
Dee's Day (2003–2007; RPN)
Dream Maker Pause and Play (2023–present; PIE Channel)
Entertainment Konek (2005–2006; ABS-CBN)
Entertainment Live (2007–2012; ABS-CBN)
Eye to Eye (1988–1996; GMA)
Face the People (2013–2014; TV5)
Face to Face (2010–2013; TV5)
Gandang Gabi, Vice! (2011–2020; ABS-CBN)
Get It Straight (2010–present; UNTV)
Good Morning Girls (2013–2014; TV5)
Good Morning, Kris (2004; ABS-CBN)
Good Vibes (2017–2020; DZMM TeleRadyo)
Happy Wife, Happy Life (2015; TV5)
Hataw Pinoy (IBC)
Homeboy (2005–2007; ABS-CBN)
H.O.T. TV: Hindi Ordinaryong Tsismis (2012–2013; GMA)
Juicy! (2008–2012; TV5)
Kapwa Ko Mahal Ko (1975–present; GMA)
Katok Mga Misis (1995–1998; GMA)
 Kay Susan Tayo sa Super Radyo DZBB (2019–2020, GMA News TV)
Kontrobersyal (2003–2006; ABS-CBN)
Kris TV (2011–2016; ABS-CBN)
Love ni Mister, Love ni Misis (2010–2011; GMA)
Magandang Buhay (2016–2020; ABS-CBN, 2020–present; Kapamilya Channel/A2Z)
Magandang Morning (2007–2020; DZMM TeleRadyo)
Mars (2012–2019; GMA News TV)
Martin After Dark (1988–1998; GMA and ABS-CBN)
Martin Late at Nite (1998–2003; ABS-CBN)
Martin Late at Night (2013; ABS-CBN)
Mars Pa More (2019–2022; GMA)
Master Showman Presents
Mel & Jay (1989–1996; ABS-CBN)
Mel and Joey (2004–2011; GMA)
Mismo! (2011–2017; DZMM TeleRadyo)
Moms (2005–2009; QTV/Q)
Morning Girls (2002–2003; ABS-CBN)
Morning Girls with Kris and Korina (2003–2004; ABS-CBN)
Morning Star (2004–2005; ABS-CBN)
Network Forum (NBN)
OMJ! (2014–2020; DZMM TeleRadyo)
Paparazzi (2010–2012; TV5)
Partners Mel and Jay (1996–2004; GMA)
Partners with Mel Tiangco (2004; GMA)
Rated K (2004–2020; ABS-CBN)
Rated Korina (2020–present; TV5, 2021–present; Kapamilya Channel/A2Z)
Real Talk (2015–2017; CNN Philippines)
Ruffa & Ai (2009; ABS-CBN)
The Ryzza Mae Show (2013–2015; GMA)
S-Files (1998–2007; GMA)
Sakto! (2014–2020; DZMM TeleRadyo, 2020–present; Kapamilya Channel/TeleRadyo)
Sapul sa Singko (2010–2012; TV5)
See True (1980–1986; IBC, 1986–1987; GMA)
Seeing Stars with Joe Quirino (1973–1986; IBC)
Scoop (1986–1987; IBC)
Sharon (1998–2004, 2006–2010; ABS-CBN)
Showbiz Central (2007–2012; GMA)
Showbiz Extra (2007; DZMM TeleRadyo)
Showbiz FM (2011–2020; AksyonTV/One PH)
Showbiz Inside Report (2012–2013; ABS-CBN)
Showbiz Ka! (2007; RPN)
Showbiz Lingo (1992–1999, ABS–CBN)
Showbiz Mismo (2007–2011; DZMM TeleRadyo)
Showbiz No. 1 (2004–2005; ABS-CBN)
Showbiz Pa More! (2018–2021; Jeepney TV)
Showbiz Police: Intriga Under Arrest (2013–2014; TV5)
Showbiz Stripped (2005–2007; GMA)
Showbuzz (2017–2020; DZMM TeleRadyo)
SiS (2001–2010; GMA)
SNN: Showbiz News Ngayon (2009–2011; ABS-CBN)
Solved na Solved (2015; TV5)
Spotlight with Andy Alviz (CLTV36)
Star Box (2011; GMA)
Startalk (1995–2015; GMA)
Talk Ko 'To! (2007–2008; NBN)
The Source (2016–present; CNN Philippines)
The Sweet Life (2007–2011; Q)
The Tim Yap Show (2013–2015; GMA)
Today with Kris Aquino (1996–2001; ABS-CBN)
Todo-Todo Walang Preno (2007–2020; DZMM TeleRadyo)
Toni (2022–present; All TV)
Toni Talks (2022; All TV)
Tonight with Arnold Clavio (2010–2011; Q, 2011–2020; GMA News TV)
Tonight with Boy Abunda (2015–2020; ABS-CBN)
Turo-Turo (2014–2020; DZMM TeleRadyo)
Umagang Kay Ganda (2007–2020; ABS-CBN)
Unang Hirit (1999–present; GMA)
Usap Tayo: Super Kwentuhan with Mark and Susan! (2020–2021; GMA News TV)
Wasak (2011–2016; AksyonTV)

Variety shows

Aja Aja Tayo! (2018–2019; TV5)
Aja Aja Tayo! sa Jeju (2021; Kapamilya Channel/A2Z)
Alas Dose sa Trese (1999–2000; IBC)
All-Out Sundays (2020–present; GMA)
Ariel con Tina (1972–1974; GMA)
Aawitan Kita (2002–2006, ABC)
ABS-CBN Christmas Special (airs annually)
An Evening with Raoul (2017; IBC)
Apat Na Sikat (1975–1981; IBC)
ASAP (1995–2020; ABS-CBN, 2020–present; Kapamilya Channel/Metro Channel/A2Z, 2021–present; TV5/Jeepney TV)
 aka ASAP Mania, ASAP '05, ASAP '06, ASAP '07, ASAP '08, ASAP '09, ASAP XV, ASAP Rocks, ASAP 2012, ASAP 18, ASAP 19, ASAP 20, ASAP Natin 'To
ASAP Fanatic (2004–2006; ABS-CBN)
Bongga! (1999–2007; GMA Iloilo)
Chibugan Na! (1994–1996; RPN)
Chowtime Na! (2004–2006; IBC)
Chinese Variety Show (1996–2003; ABC)
Coke Studio Philippines (2017–2019; TV5/ABS-CBN)
D.A.T.S. (1996; GMA)
Dance Upon A Time with Becky Garcia (1993-1997; RJTV)
DMV: Dream Music Videos (2004–2008; ABC)
Eat Bulaga! (1979–1989; RPN, 1989–1995; ABS-CBN, 1995–present; GMA)
Eezy Dancing (1996–2002; ABC)
Everybody, Sing! (2021–present; Kapamilya Channel/A2Z, 2022–present; TV5)
Flex (2021; GTV)
GMA New Year's Eve Countdown Special (airs annually)
GMA Supershow (1978–1997; GMA)
Game 'N Go (2012–2013; TV5)
Happy Time (2020–2021; Net 25)
Happy Truck ng Bayan (2015–2016, TV5)
HAPPinas Happy Hour (2016; TV5)
Happy Truck HAPPinas (2016; TV5)
Happy, Yipee, Yehey (2011–2012; ABS-CBN)
Hey It's Saberdey! (2011–2012; TV5)
It's Showtime (2009–2020; ABS-CBN, 2020–present; Kapamilya Channel, A2Z/Jeepney TV, 2022–present; TV5)
Jukebox Jamboree (1974–1976; GMA)
KSP: Kapamilya Sabado Party (2005–2007; ABS-CBN Davao)
Kesayasaya (2020–present; Net 25)
Klik na Klik sa Trese (1997–2001; IBC)
Kuyaw! (2005–2008; GMA Davao)
Loveliness (1987–1988; ABS-CBN, 1988–1990; IBC)
Lunch Break (1974–1975; GMA)
Lunch Break (2000–2003, IBC)
Lunch Date (1986–1993; GMA)
Lunch Out Loud (2020–present; TV5, 2022–present; Kapamilya Channel/A2Z)
 Tropang LOL (2022–present)
Maricel Live (1986; IBC)
Marian (2014; GMA)
M.R.S. (Most Requested Show) (2005; ABS-CBN)
MTB (1998–2005; ABS-CBN)
 Magandang Tanghali Bayan (1998–2003)
 Masayang Tanghali Bayan (2003–2004)
 MTB Ang Saya Saya! (2004–2005)
Musical Moment with Cris Cadiang (2015–2016, 2017; CLTV36)
Music Bureau (1993–1998; ABC)
P.O.5 (2010–2011; TV5)
Party Pilipinas (2010–2013; GMA)
Pilipinas Win Na Win (2010; ABS-CBN)
R.S.V.P. (1991–1995; GMA)
Rush TV (2007–2008; Studio 23)
Ryan Ryan Musikahan (1988–1995; ABS-CBN)
Sabado Barkada (2003–2007; ABS-CBN Bacolod)
Sabado Na Gyud (1997–2005; ABS-CBN Cebu)
SST: Salo-Salo Together (1993–1995; GMA)
Sa Linggo nAPO Sila (1989–1995; ABS-CBN)
'Sang Linggo nAPO Sila (1995–1998; ABS-CBN)
'Sabado Jam (1997–1999; ABS-CBN Davao)
SayaBadabaDoo! (1999–2003; ABS-CBN Davao)
 SBD Jam (2003–2005; ABS-CBN Davao)Show Up: Ang Bagong Game Show ng Bayan (2012–2013; PTV)SOP (1997–2010; GMA)SOP Gigsters (2004–2006; GMA)Stage One: The Starstruck PlayhouseStudent Canteen (1958–1965; ABS-CBN, 1975–1986; GMA, 1989–1990; RPN)Studio 7 (2018–2019; GMA)Sunday Funday (IBC)Sunday All Stars (2013–2015; GMA)Sunday Noontime Live! (2020–2021; TV5)Sunday PinaSaya (2015–2019; GMA)Superstar (1975–1990; RPN)Tara Let's! (2016; CLTV36)That's Entertainment (1986–1996; GMA)The Imelda Papin Show (2003–2004, RPN)The Sharon Cuneta Show (1986–1988; IBC, 1988–1997; ABS-CBN)Video Hot Tracks (1994–2000, ABC)Vilma (1986–1995; GMA)Vilma In Person (V.I.P.) (1986–1995, GMA)Walang Tulugan with the Master Showman (1997–2016; GMA)Willing Willie (2010–2011; TV5)Wil Time Bigtime (2011–2013; TV5)Wowowee (2005–2010; ABS-CBN)Wowowillie (2013; TV5)Wowowin (2015–2022; GMA, 2022–present; All TV)Ysa Ysa A Drama Enrignnement (1998, GMA)Your Face Sounds Familiar (2015–2018; ABS-CBN, 2021; Kapamilya Channel/A2Z)Zambo Jambo (1997–2005; ABS-CBN Zamboanga)

Movie Blocks and Special Shows20th Century Studios (FOX), Searchlight Pictures (2011–2013, 2014–2016, 2017–present; TV5)5 Max Movies (2008–2010; TV5)13's Movie Theater (IBC)ABCinema (1992–1998, 2004–2008; ABC)ABS-CBN PresentsAction Flicks (2020–present; Heart of Asia)Action Spectacular (2020–2021; TV5)Action Theater (1993–1996; ABC)Aliwan Sa GMAAliwan Sa PTVAll Flix (2022–present; All TV)Afternoon Movies (RPN)Afternoon Movie Break (Pinoy Movie Break) (2020–present; GMA News TV/GTV)Afternoon Zinema (2022–present; A2Z)Ang Hari: FPJ Da King (2018–2020; ABS-CBN)Asian Cinemix (2021–present; Heart of Asia)The Big Night (1992–2004; ABC)The Big Picture (2020–present; GTV)Blockbuster Cinema (2002–2003; GMA)C/S Blockbusters (2008–2009; C/S9)C/S Movie Mania (2008–2009; C/S9)Cine Cinco (2021–present; TV5)Cine Cinco: Hollywood Edition (2022–present)Cine Pinoy (1975–1989, 1990–1991; IBC)Cinema FPJ: Da King on ABS-CBN (2007–2010; ABS-CBN)Cinema Klasika (2012–2013; GMA News TV)Columbia Pictures/Sony Pictures Entertainment (2008–2010, 2011–2016, 2017–present; TV5)ETC Flix (2011–2013; ETC)Feel na Films (2020–present; Heart of Asia)FPJ Action CinemaFPJ Da King Sa ABS-CBN (2007–2010, 2013–2014, 2018–2020; ABS-CBN)FPJ Da King (2020–present; Kapamilya Channel/A2Z, 2021, 2022–present; TV5)Friday Box Office (1996–2004; ABC)Friday Fan Faves (2020–2021; TV5)Friday Night Action (2013–2014; TV5)Full-Length Movie (1974–1977; GMA)G! Flicks (2021–present; GTV)GMA's Best (1992–2002; GMA)GMA Blockbusters (2013–present; GMA)Golden Cinema (PTV)Good Vibes Wednesday (2014; TV5)Hollywood Movie (2021; TV5)IBC Movie Serials (IBC)IBC Specials (IBC)IBCinema (1975–1986; IBC)IBCinema Nights (2006–2008; IBC)Kapamilya Action Sabado (2020–present; Kapamilya Channel)Kapamilya Mega Blockbusters (2015–2018; ABS-CBN)Kapamilya Blockbusters (2010–2020; ABS-CBN, 2020–2022; Kapamilya Channel)Kapamilya Cinema (ABS-CBN)Kapamilya Gold Hits (2020-present; Kapamilya Channel)Kapuso Movie Festival (2006–present; GMA)Kapuso Movie Holidates (2021; GMA)Kapuso Movie Night (2011–2020; GMA)Kapuso Primetime Cinema (2013–2014, 2015–2016; GMA)Kapuso Sine Klasika (2014, 2015–2017; GMA)Kapuso Sine Siesta (2012–2013; GMA)KB Family Weekend (2017–2020; ABS-CBN, 2020–Present; Kapamilya Channel)Kung-Fu Fight Night (ABS-CBN)Lifetime Original Movie (2020–2021; TV5)Mega Sine (ABS-CBN)Million Dollar MoviesMonday Night Blockbusters (2013–2014; TV5)Movie Central Double Feature Presents (2020-Present; Kapamilya Channel)Movie Max 5 (2014–2018; TV5)Movies On Metro (2022; Metro Channel)MVP: Monday Viva Presentations (1994–1997; GMA)Now Showing (2000–2001; IBC, 2017–2020; GMA News TV)Pelikula sa Trese (1989; IBC)Piling-Piling Pelikula (1975–1996; IBC)Pinoy Aksyon Hits (2003–2009; IBC)Pinoy Blockbusters (1998–2002; GMA)Primetime Mega-Hits (2019–2020; TV5)Primetime Sinemax (2006–2008; IBC)Primetime Sine Festival (2021; TV5)Primetime Specials (PTV)Primetime Super Sine (2011; TV5)Primetime Zinema (2020–2021; A2Z)Rainbow Cinema (1994–1999; GMA)Sabado Movie GreatsSabado Showdown (2005–2009; QTV)Sabado Sineplex (2011–2013; TV5)Sabado Sinerama (2013–2014; TV5)Sabado Specials: Shake, Rattle and Roll (2013–2014; ABS-CBN)Sari-Sari Presents: Viva Cinema (2021–present; TV5)Saturday Afternoon Blockbusters (ABS-CBN)Saturday Cinema Hits (2020–2021; GMA News TV/GTV)Saturday/Sunday Blockbuster (2012–2013; TV5)Saturday/Sunday Night Movies (2000–2001; ABC)Saturday Night Blockbusters (1996–1998, 2006–2008; ABC)Saturday Night Playhouse (1986–2007; RPN)Saturday Night Specials (1998–1999, 2001–2003; ABC)Saturday Spectacular Specials (PTV)Siesta Fiesta Movies (2020–present; GMA News TV/GTV)Sine 2 (ABS-CBN)Sine 9 (RPN)Sine Asya (2020–2021; TV5)Sine Date Weekend (2020–present; GMA News TV/GTV)Sine Klasiks (1992–2002; ABC)Sine Ko Singko (a.k.a. Sine ko 5ingko) (2013–2014; TV5)Sine Ko Singko Hapon (2013–2014)Sine Ko Singko Indie toSine Ko Singko PremiereSine Ko Singko PrimeSine Ko Singko WeekendSine Komiks (2009–2010; IBC)Sine Sabado (2012–2014; GMA News TV)Sine Spectacular (2019–2020; TV5)Sine Spotlight (2021–present; TV5)Sine Squad (2016–2019; TV5)Sine Squad Prime (2018–2019)Sine Squad Sabado (2019)Sine Squad Sunday (2019)Sinemaks (1998–2003; IBC)Sine Natin Ito (2013–2016; ABS-CBN)Sinetanghali (2011–2013; TV5)Sine Throwback (2022–present; Net 25)Sine Todo (2021–present; TV5)SNBO: Sunday Night Box Office (1996–2020; GMA)Spectacular Action on Screen (1987; IBC)Solar's Big Ticket (2010–2011; Solar TV)Solar's Golden Ticket (2009–2010; Solar TV)Star Cinema Presents (2013; Studio 23)Strictly Pinoy (2020–present; Heart of Asia)Sunday's Best (2006–2020; ABS-CBN, 2020–present; Kapamilya Channel)Sunday Kapamilya Blockbusters (2022; Kapamilya Channel)Sunday Night Specials (1996–2001; ABC)Sunday Sineplex (2011–2013, 2013–2014; TV5)Sunday Super Sine (2005–2008; QTV)Super Sine 5 (a.k.a. Super Sine Singko) (2011–2012, 2012–2013; TV5)Super Sine Prime (2012–2013; TV5)Takilya Blockbusters (2012–2019; GMA News TV)Thursday Night at the Movies (2000–2001; IBC)Tuesday Christmas Countdown (2013; TV5)Tuesday Happy Hour (2014; TV5)Tuesday Viva Presentations (1997–1998; GMA)TVFilx (2020–2021; TV5)Viva Blockbusters (1998–2002; ABC)Viva Box Office (2001–2003; IBC)Viva Cine Idols (2004–2005; ABC)Viva Movie Specials (2022–present; GTV)Viva Premiere Night (2000–2001; IBC)Viva Proudly Presents (2000–2001; IBC)Viva Sinerama (1992–2001; GMA)Wednesday Night Thrillers (2013; TV5)Zine Aksyon (2020–present; A2Z)Zine Love (2020–2022; A2Z)Zinema Sa Umaga (2020–present; A2Z)

Other Philippine television showsASEAN 101 (produced by People's Television Network, 2019; IBC) ASEAN Spotlight TV (produced by People's Television Network, 2019–2022; IBC)Cinema...Cinema...Cinema (1999–2006; ABS-CBN)EBC Earth Files (IBC)Global Family Series (2003–2005; IBC)Fans Kita (2005–2006; QTV)Filipknow (2012–2015; GMA News TV)Hapinas (2006–2008; QTV)Idol sa Kusina (2011–2020; GMA News TV)Kakaibang Lunas (King's Herbal) (2013–2018; PTV)Movie Greats (1991–1996; ABS-CBN)Movieparade (1986–1991; ABS-CBN)Pop Talk (2011–2021; GMA News TV)Road Trip (2012–2019; GMA News TV)Road Trip Refueled (2012–2022; Light TV)Retro TV (2003–2004, 2004–2007, 2014, 2019; IBC)Sarap at Home (2009–2012; Q/GMA News TV)Sarap with Family (2013–2017; GMA News TV)Saving ASEAN Natural Treasures (2011–2012; NBN)Spoon (2007–2015; Net 25)Star Music Video (1995–2002; ABS-CBN)Taste Buddies (2012–2022; GMA News TV/GTV)Tribe (2006–2013, 2014–2019; Net 25)The Isla Hour (2002–2006; NBN)This Is My Story, This Is My Song (2012–2018; Light TV)Video Hit Parade'' (1986–1992; ABS-CBN)

See also

 Television in the Philippines
 List of most watched television broadcasts in the Philippines
 List of Philippine television shows currently in productionChannels:'''
 List of programs broadcast by TV5 (Philippine TV network)
 List of programs aired by TV5 (Philippine TV network)
 List of programs broadcast by ABS-CBN
 List of programs aired by Banahaw Broadcasting Corporation
 List of programs broadcast by Jeepney TV
 List of programs broadcast by Kapamilya Channel
 List of programs aired by Kapamilya Channel
 List of programs broadcast by Knowledge Channel
 List of programs broadcast by A2Z (Philippine TV channel)
 List of programs broadcast by GMA Network
 List of programs previously broadcast by GMA Network
 List of programs aired by Fox Filipino
 List of programs broadcast by Intercontinental Broadcasting Corporation
 List of programs previously broadcast by Intercontinental Broadcasting Corporation
 List of programs broadcast by People's Television Network
 List of programs aired by People's Television Network
 List of programs broadcast by Net 25
 List of programs previously broadcast by Net 25
 List of programs broadcast by GTV (Philippine TV network)
 List of programs previously broadcast by QTV, Q, GMA News TV and GTV
 List of programs broadcast by Light TV
 List of programs aired by Light TV (Main Light TV 33/ZOE TV 11/33 feed)
 List of programs broadcast by RJTV
 List of programs previously broadcast by RJTV
 DWDB-TV
 List of programs broadcast by UNTV
 List of programs broadcast by BEAM TV
 List of programs broadcast by CNN Philippines
 List of programs previously broadcast by Radio Philippines Network
 List of programs broadcast by ETC
 List of programs previously broadcast by Southern Broadcasting Network
 List of programs broadcast by Jack TV
 List of programs previously broadcast by CT
 List of programs broadcast by ABS-CBN Sports and Action
 List of programs aired by ABS-CBN Sports and Action
 List of programs aired by Studio 23
 List of programs broadcast by One Sports
 List of programs aired by AksyonTV/5 Plus
 List of programs broadcast by TeleRadyo
 List of programs aired by DZMM/TeleRadyo
 List of programs aired by ZOE TV (DZOE-TV 11 feed)
 List of programs broadcast by Yey!
 List of programs previously broadcast by Yey!
 List of programs broadcast by CLTV36

References 

Lists of television series by country of production
 
Philippine television-related lists
Lists of Philippine television shows